

378001–378100 

|-bgcolor=#fefefe
| 378001 ||  || — || September 15, 2006 || Kitt Peak || Spacewatch || — || align=right data-sort-value="0.70" | 700 m || 
|-id=002 bgcolor=#fefefe
| 378002 ʻAkialoa ||  ||  || September 14, 2006 || Mauna Kea || J. Masiero || V || align=right data-sort-value="0.55" | 550 m || 
|-id=003 bgcolor=#fefefe
| 378003 || 2006 SW || — || September 17, 2006 || Pla D'Arguines || R. Ferrando || — || align=right data-sort-value="0.76" | 760 m || 
|-id=004 bgcolor=#fefefe
| 378004 ||  || — || September 16, 2006 || Catalina || CSS || — || align=right data-sort-value="0.76" | 760 m || 
|-id=005 bgcolor=#fefefe
| 378005 ||  || — || September 17, 2006 || Kitt Peak || Spacewatch || — || align=right data-sort-value="0.75" | 750 m || 
|-id=006 bgcolor=#fefefe
| 378006 ||  || — || September 17, 2006 || Kitt Peak || Spacewatch || — || align=right data-sort-value="0.73" | 730 m || 
|-id=007 bgcolor=#fefefe
| 378007 ||  || — || September 18, 2006 || Kitt Peak || Spacewatch || — || align=right data-sort-value="0.85" | 850 m || 
|-id=008 bgcolor=#fefefe
| 378008 ||  || — || September 16, 2006 || Catalina || CSS || — || align=right data-sort-value="0.98" | 980 m || 
|-id=009 bgcolor=#FA8072
| 378009 ||  || — || September 18, 2006 || Kitt Peak || Spacewatch || — || align=right data-sort-value="0.78" | 780 m || 
|-id=010 bgcolor=#fefefe
| 378010 ||  || — || September 18, 2006 || Catalina || CSS || — || align=right data-sort-value="0.96" | 960 m || 
|-id=011 bgcolor=#fefefe
| 378011 ||  || — || September 19, 2006 || Kitt Peak || Spacewatch || — || align=right data-sort-value="0.56" | 560 m || 
|-id=012 bgcolor=#fefefe
| 378012 ||  || — || September 19, 2006 || Kitt Peak || Spacewatch || FLO || align=right data-sort-value="0.63" | 630 m || 
|-id=013 bgcolor=#E9E9E9
| 378013 ||  || — || September 19, 2006 || Kitt Peak || Spacewatch || — || align=right | 1.0 km || 
|-id=014 bgcolor=#fefefe
| 378014 ||  || — || September 19, 2006 || Kitt Peak || Spacewatch || — || align=right data-sort-value="0.78" | 780 m || 
|-id=015 bgcolor=#fefefe
| 378015 ||  || — || September 23, 2006 || Kitt Peak || Spacewatch || — || align=right data-sort-value="0.71" | 710 m || 
|-id=016 bgcolor=#fefefe
| 378016 ||  || — || September 24, 2006 || Kitt Peak || Spacewatch || FLO || align=right data-sort-value="0.50" | 500 m || 
|-id=017 bgcolor=#fefefe
| 378017 ||  || — || September 24, 2006 || Kitt Peak || Spacewatch || V || align=right data-sort-value="0.49" | 490 m || 
|-id=018 bgcolor=#fefefe
| 378018 ||  || — || September 25, 2006 || Kitt Peak || Spacewatch || FLO || align=right data-sort-value="0.81" | 810 m || 
|-id=019 bgcolor=#fefefe
| 378019 ||  || — || September 25, 2006 || Kitt Peak || Spacewatch || FLO || align=right data-sort-value="0.48" | 480 m || 
|-id=020 bgcolor=#fefefe
| 378020 ||  || — || September 26, 2006 || Kitt Peak || Spacewatch || — || align=right data-sort-value="0.80" | 800 m || 
|-id=021 bgcolor=#fefefe
| 378021 ||  || — || September 26, 2006 || Kitt Peak || Spacewatch || — || align=right data-sort-value="0.61" | 610 m || 
|-id=022 bgcolor=#fefefe
| 378022 ||  || — || September 18, 2006 || Anderson Mesa || LONEOS || — || align=right data-sort-value="0.72" | 720 m || 
|-id=023 bgcolor=#fefefe
| 378023 ||  || — || September 27, 2006 || Kitt Peak || Spacewatch || — || align=right data-sort-value="0.77" | 770 m || 
|-id=024 bgcolor=#E9E9E9
| 378024 ||  || — || September 27, 2006 || Kitt Peak || Spacewatch || — || align=right | 1.9 km || 
|-id=025 bgcolor=#fefefe
| 378025 ||  || — || September 27, 2006 || Kitt Peak || Spacewatch || V || align=right data-sort-value="0.61" | 610 m || 
|-id=026 bgcolor=#E9E9E9
| 378026 ||  || — || September 17, 2006 || Kitt Peak || Spacewatch || HOF || align=right | 2.3 km || 
|-id=027 bgcolor=#fefefe
| 378027 ||  || — || September 27, 2006 || Kitt Peak || Spacewatch || — || align=right data-sort-value="0.72" | 720 m || 
|-id=028 bgcolor=#fefefe
| 378028 ||  || — || September 28, 2006 || Kitt Peak || Spacewatch || — || align=right data-sort-value="0.62" | 620 m || 
|-id=029 bgcolor=#fefefe
| 378029 ||  || — || September 28, 2006 || Kitt Peak || Spacewatch || — || align=right data-sort-value="0.58" | 580 m || 
|-id=030 bgcolor=#fefefe
| 378030 ||  || — || September 30, 2006 || Catalina || CSS || FLO || align=right data-sort-value="0.51" | 510 m || 
|-id=031 bgcolor=#fefefe
| 378031 ||  || — || September 30, 2006 || Catalina || CSS || FLO || align=right data-sort-value="0.60" | 600 m || 
|-id=032 bgcolor=#fefefe
| 378032 ||  || — || September 30, 2006 || Mount Lemmon || Mount Lemmon Survey || — || align=right data-sort-value="0.69" | 690 m || 
|-id=033 bgcolor=#fefefe
| 378033 ||  || — || September 18, 2006 || Kitt Peak || Spacewatch || — || align=right data-sort-value="0.62" | 620 m || 
|-id=034 bgcolor=#fefefe
| 378034 ||  || — || September 25, 2006 || Mount Lemmon || Mount Lemmon Survey || — || align=right data-sort-value="0.77" | 770 m || 
|-id=035 bgcolor=#fefefe
| 378035 ||  || — || September 30, 2006 || Mount Lemmon || Mount Lemmon Survey || FLO || align=right data-sort-value="0.77" | 770 m || 
|-id=036 bgcolor=#fefefe
| 378036 ||  || — || September 28, 2006 || Mount Lemmon || Mount Lemmon Survey || — || align=right data-sort-value="0.87" | 870 m || 
|-id=037 bgcolor=#fefefe
| 378037 ||  || — || September 27, 2006 || Mount Lemmon || Mount Lemmon Survey || MAS || align=right data-sort-value="0.52" | 520 m || 
|-id=038 bgcolor=#fefefe
| 378038 ||  || — || September 25, 2006 || Kitt Peak || Spacewatch || — || align=right data-sort-value="0.57" | 570 m || 
|-id=039 bgcolor=#fefefe
| 378039 ||  || — || September 16, 2006 || Kitt Peak || Spacewatch || — || align=right data-sort-value="0.67" | 670 m || 
|-id=040 bgcolor=#fefefe
| 378040 ||  || — || September 20, 2006 || Kitt Peak || Spacewatch || V || align=right data-sort-value="0.50" | 500 m || 
|-id=041 bgcolor=#fefefe
| 378041 ||  || — || September 28, 2006 || Catalina || CSS || — || align=right | 1.00 km || 
|-id=042 bgcolor=#fefefe
| 378042 ||  || — || December 22, 2003 || Kitt Peak || Spacewatch || FLO || align=right data-sort-value="0.58" | 580 m || 
|-id=043 bgcolor=#fefefe
| 378043 ||  || — || October 11, 2006 || Kitt Peak || Spacewatch || NYS || align=right data-sort-value="0.41" | 410 m || 
|-id=044 bgcolor=#fefefe
| 378044 ||  || — || October 11, 2006 || Kitt Peak || Spacewatch || — || align=right data-sort-value="0.71" | 710 m || 
|-id=045 bgcolor=#fefefe
| 378045 ||  || — || October 11, 2006 || Kitt Peak || Spacewatch || — || align=right data-sort-value="0.99" | 990 m || 
|-id=046 bgcolor=#fefefe
| 378046 ||  || — || September 30, 2006 || Mount Lemmon || Mount Lemmon Survey || — || align=right data-sort-value="0.69" | 690 m || 
|-id=047 bgcolor=#fefefe
| 378047 ||  || — || October 12, 2006 || Kitt Peak || Spacewatch || — || align=right data-sort-value="0.52" | 520 m || 
|-id=048 bgcolor=#fefefe
| 378048 ||  || — || October 12, 2006 || Kitt Peak || Spacewatch || — || align=right data-sort-value="0.90" | 900 m || 
|-id=049 bgcolor=#fefefe
| 378049 ||  || — || October 12, 2006 || Kitt Peak || Spacewatch || — || align=right data-sort-value="0.66" | 660 m || 
|-id=050 bgcolor=#d6d6d6
| 378050 ||  || — || October 12, 2006 || Kitt Peak || Spacewatch || SYL7:4 || align=right | 3.6 km || 
|-id=051 bgcolor=#fefefe
| 378051 ||  || — || October 12, 2006 || Kitt Peak || Spacewatch || — || align=right data-sort-value="0.58" | 580 m || 
|-id=052 bgcolor=#fefefe
| 378052 ||  || — || October 12, 2006 || Kitt Peak || Spacewatch || — || align=right data-sort-value="0.89" | 890 m || 
|-id=053 bgcolor=#fefefe
| 378053 ||  || — || October 13, 2006 || Kitt Peak || Spacewatch || — || align=right data-sort-value="0.78" | 780 m || 
|-id=054 bgcolor=#FA8072
| 378054 ||  || — || October 13, 2006 || Kitt Peak || Spacewatch || — || align=right data-sort-value="0.58" | 580 m || 
|-id=055 bgcolor=#fefefe
| 378055 ||  || — || October 11, 2006 || Kitt Peak || Spacewatch || V || align=right data-sort-value="0.66" | 660 m || 
|-id=056 bgcolor=#FA8072
| 378056 ||  || — || October 11, 2006 || Palomar || NEAT || — || align=right data-sort-value="0.72" | 720 m || 
|-id=057 bgcolor=#fefefe
| 378057 ||  || — || October 4, 2006 || Mount Lemmon || Mount Lemmon Survey || — || align=right data-sort-value="0.77" | 770 m || 
|-id=058 bgcolor=#fefefe
| 378058 ||  || — || October 4, 2006 || Mount Lemmon || Mount Lemmon Survey || FLO || align=right data-sort-value="0.71" | 710 m || 
|-id=059 bgcolor=#fefefe
| 378059 ||  || — || October 13, 2006 || Kitt Peak || Spacewatch || NYS || align=right data-sort-value="0.58" | 580 m || 
|-id=060 bgcolor=#fefefe
| 378060 ||  || — || October 13, 2006 || Kitt Peak || Spacewatch || — || align=right data-sort-value="0.90" | 900 m || 
|-id=061 bgcolor=#fefefe
| 378061 ||  || — || October 13, 2006 || Kitt Peak || Spacewatch || NYS || align=right data-sort-value="0.62" | 620 m || 
|-id=062 bgcolor=#fefefe
| 378062 ||  || — || October 2, 2006 || Mount Lemmon || Mount Lemmon Survey || V || align=right data-sort-value="0.68" | 680 m || 
|-id=063 bgcolor=#fefefe
| 378063 ||  || — || October 15, 2006 || Kitt Peak || Spacewatch || PHO || align=right | 1.2 km || 
|-id=064 bgcolor=#fefefe
| 378064 ||  || — || October 15, 2006 || Kitt Peak || Spacewatch || — || align=right data-sort-value="0.75" | 750 m || 
|-id=065 bgcolor=#fefefe
| 378065 ||  || — || October 13, 2006 || Kitt Peak || Spacewatch || FLO || align=right data-sort-value="0.72" | 720 m || 
|-id=066 bgcolor=#fefefe
| 378066 ||  || — || October 2, 2006 || Catalina || CSS || — || align=right data-sort-value="0.93" | 930 m || 
|-id=067 bgcolor=#fefefe
| 378067 ||  || — || October 3, 2006 || Mount Lemmon || Mount Lemmon Survey || — || align=right data-sort-value="0.75" | 750 m || 
|-id=068 bgcolor=#fefefe
| 378068 ||  || — || October 17, 2006 || Mount Lemmon || Mount Lemmon Survey || — || align=right data-sort-value="0.82" | 820 m || 
|-id=069 bgcolor=#fefefe
| 378069 ||  || — || October 17, 2006 || Mount Lemmon || Mount Lemmon Survey || MAS || align=right data-sort-value="0.59" | 590 m || 
|-id=070 bgcolor=#fefefe
| 378070 ||  || — || October 16, 2006 || Kitt Peak || Spacewatch || — || align=right | 1.4 km || 
|-id=071 bgcolor=#fefefe
| 378071 ||  || — || October 16, 2006 || Kitt Peak || Spacewatch || — || align=right data-sort-value="0.76" | 760 m || 
|-id=072 bgcolor=#fefefe
| 378072 ||  || — || October 17, 2006 || Kitt Peak || Spacewatch || FLO || align=right data-sort-value="0.93" | 930 m || 
|-id=073 bgcolor=#fefefe
| 378073 ||  || — || October 17, 2006 || Mount Lemmon || Mount Lemmon Survey || — || align=right data-sort-value="0.71" | 710 m || 
|-id=074 bgcolor=#fefefe
| 378074 ||  || — || October 17, 2006 || Catalina || CSS || — || align=right data-sort-value="0.81" | 810 m || 
|-id=075 bgcolor=#fefefe
| 378075 ||  || — || October 17, 2006 || Mount Lemmon || Mount Lemmon Survey || — || align=right data-sort-value="0.73" | 730 m || 
|-id=076 bgcolor=#fefefe
| 378076 Campani ||  ||  || October 23, 2006 || Vallemare di Borbona || V. S. Casulli || — || align=right data-sort-value="0.96" | 960 m || 
|-id=077 bgcolor=#fefefe
| 378077 ||  || — || October 16, 2006 || Mount Lemmon || Mount Lemmon Survey || — || align=right data-sort-value="0.76" | 760 m || 
|-id=078 bgcolor=#fefefe
| 378078 ||  || — || October 3, 2006 || Mount Lemmon || Mount Lemmon Survey || V || align=right data-sort-value="0.65" | 650 m || 
|-id=079 bgcolor=#fefefe
| 378079 ||  || — || October 16, 2006 || Catalina || CSS || FLO || align=right data-sort-value="0.68" | 680 m || 
|-id=080 bgcolor=#fefefe
| 378080 ||  || — || October 17, 2006 || Kitt Peak || Spacewatch || — || align=right data-sort-value="0.92" | 920 m || 
|-id=081 bgcolor=#fefefe
| 378081 ||  || — || October 17, 2006 || Kitt Peak || Spacewatch || FLO || align=right data-sort-value="0.62" | 620 m || 
|-id=082 bgcolor=#fefefe
| 378082 ||  || — || October 2, 2006 || Mount Lemmon || Mount Lemmon Survey || FLO || align=right data-sort-value="0.61" | 610 m || 
|-id=083 bgcolor=#fefefe
| 378083 ||  || — || October 17, 2006 || Kitt Peak || Spacewatch || — || align=right data-sort-value="0.75" | 750 m || 
|-id=084 bgcolor=#fefefe
| 378084 ||  || — || October 17, 2006 || Mount Lemmon || Mount Lemmon Survey || — || align=right | 1.1 km || 
|-id=085 bgcolor=#fefefe
| 378085 ||  || — || October 17, 2006 || Kitt Peak || Spacewatch || NYS || align=right data-sort-value="0.58" | 580 m || 
|-id=086 bgcolor=#fefefe
| 378086 ||  || — || October 17, 2006 || Kitt Peak || Spacewatch || FLO || align=right data-sort-value="0.61" | 610 m || 
|-id=087 bgcolor=#fefefe
| 378087 ||  || — || October 17, 2006 || Kitt Peak || Spacewatch || V || align=right data-sort-value="0.56" | 560 m || 
|-id=088 bgcolor=#fefefe
| 378088 ||  || — || October 18, 2006 || Kitt Peak || Spacewatch || — || align=right data-sort-value="0.85" | 850 m || 
|-id=089 bgcolor=#fefefe
| 378089 ||  || — || October 18, 2006 || Kitt Peak || Spacewatch || NYS || align=right data-sort-value="0.48" | 480 m || 
|-id=090 bgcolor=#fefefe
| 378090 ||  || — || October 18, 2006 || Kitt Peak || Spacewatch || — || align=right data-sort-value="0.82" | 820 m || 
|-id=091 bgcolor=#fefefe
| 378091 ||  || — || October 18, 2006 || Kitt Peak || Spacewatch || FLO || align=right data-sort-value="0.66" | 660 m || 
|-id=092 bgcolor=#fefefe
| 378092 ||  || — || October 18, 2006 || Kitt Peak || Spacewatch || FLO || align=right data-sort-value="0.66" | 660 m || 
|-id=093 bgcolor=#fefefe
| 378093 ||  || — || August 29, 2006 || Anderson Mesa || LONEOS || V || align=right data-sort-value="0.66" | 660 m || 
|-id=094 bgcolor=#fefefe
| 378094 ||  || — || October 3, 2006 || Mount Lemmon || Mount Lemmon Survey || — || align=right data-sort-value="0.65" | 650 m || 
|-id=095 bgcolor=#fefefe
| 378095 ||  || — || October 19, 2006 || Kitt Peak || Spacewatch || FLO || align=right data-sort-value="0.69" | 690 m || 
|-id=096 bgcolor=#fefefe
| 378096 ||  || — || September 18, 2006 || Kitt Peak || Spacewatch || — || align=right data-sort-value="0.69" | 690 m || 
|-id=097 bgcolor=#fefefe
| 378097 ||  || — || October 21, 2006 || Mount Lemmon || Mount Lemmon Survey || — || align=right data-sort-value="0.67" | 670 m || 
|-id=098 bgcolor=#fefefe
| 378098 ||  || — || October 21, 2006 || Mount Lemmon || Mount Lemmon Survey || — || align=right data-sort-value="0.84" | 840 m || 
|-id=099 bgcolor=#fefefe
| 378099 ||  || — || October 3, 2006 || Mount Lemmon || Mount Lemmon Survey || — || align=right data-sort-value="0.65" | 650 m || 
|-id=100 bgcolor=#FA8072
| 378100 ||  || — || October 21, 2006 || Mount Lemmon || Mount Lemmon Survey || — || align=right data-sort-value="0.74" | 740 m || 
|}

378101–378200 

|-bgcolor=#fefefe
| 378101 ||  || — || October 2, 2006 || Mount Lemmon || Mount Lemmon Survey || NYS || align=right data-sort-value="0.59" | 590 m || 
|-id=102 bgcolor=#fefefe
| 378102 ||  || — || September 28, 2006 || Catalina || CSS || FLO || align=right data-sort-value="0.70" | 700 m || 
|-id=103 bgcolor=#fefefe
| 378103 ||  || — || October 21, 2006 || Kitt Peak || Spacewatch || FLO || align=right data-sort-value="0.65" | 650 m || 
|-id=104 bgcolor=#fefefe
| 378104 ||  || — || October 23, 2006 || Kitt Peak || Spacewatch || V || align=right data-sort-value="0.67" | 670 m || 
|-id=105 bgcolor=#fefefe
| 378105 ||  || — || September 28, 2006 || Mount Lemmon || Mount Lemmon Survey || FLO || align=right data-sort-value="0.53" | 530 m || 
|-id=106 bgcolor=#fefefe
| 378106 ||  || — || September 26, 2006 || Catalina || CSS || — || align=right data-sort-value="0.85" | 850 m || 
|-id=107 bgcolor=#fefefe
| 378107 ||  || — || October 16, 2006 || Catalina || CSS || V || align=right data-sort-value="0.63" | 630 m || 
|-id=108 bgcolor=#d6d6d6
| 378108 ||  || — || October 19, 2006 || Mount Lemmon || Mount Lemmon Survey || 7:4 || align=right | 6.2 km || 
|-id=109 bgcolor=#fefefe
| 378109 ||  || — || October 19, 2006 || Catalina || CSS || FLO || align=right data-sort-value="0.80" | 800 m || 
|-id=110 bgcolor=#fefefe
| 378110 ||  || — || October 23, 2006 || Kitt Peak || Spacewatch || FLO || align=right data-sort-value="0.63" | 630 m || 
|-id=111 bgcolor=#fefefe
| 378111 ||  || — || October 23, 2006 || Kitt Peak || Spacewatch || — || align=right data-sort-value="0.68" | 680 m || 
|-id=112 bgcolor=#fefefe
| 378112 ||  || — || October 23, 2006 || Kitt Peak || Spacewatch || V || align=right data-sort-value="0.68" | 680 m || 
|-id=113 bgcolor=#fefefe
| 378113 ||  || — || October 27, 2006 || Mount Lemmon || Mount Lemmon Survey || MAS || align=right data-sort-value="0.60" | 600 m || 
|-id=114 bgcolor=#fefefe
| 378114 ||  || — || October 27, 2006 || Mount Lemmon || Mount Lemmon Survey || FLO || align=right data-sort-value="0.43" | 430 m || 
|-id=115 bgcolor=#fefefe
| 378115 ||  || — || October 28, 2006 || Mount Lemmon || Mount Lemmon Survey || — || align=right data-sort-value="0.79" | 790 m || 
|-id=116 bgcolor=#fefefe
| 378116 ||  || — || October 28, 2006 || Mount Lemmon || Mount Lemmon Survey || FLO || align=right data-sort-value="0.67" | 670 m || 
|-id=117 bgcolor=#fefefe
| 378117 ||  || — || October 28, 2006 || Mount Lemmon || Mount Lemmon Survey || — || align=right data-sort-value="0.59" | 590 m || 
|-id=118 bgcolor=#fefefe
| 378118 ||  || — || September 30, 2006 || Mount Lemmon || Mount Lemmon Survey || PHO || align=right data-sort-value="0.92" | 920 m || 
|-id=119 bgcolor=#fefefe
| 378119 ||  || — || October 19, 2006 || Kitt Peak || M. W. Buie || V || align=right data-sort-value="0.59" | 590 m || 
|-id=120 bgcolor=#fefefe
| 378120 ||  || — || October 16, 2006 || Kitt Peak || Spacewatch || NYS || align=right data-sort-value="0.50" | 500 m || 
|-id=121 bgcolor=#fefefe
| 378121 ||  || — || October 29, 2006 || Mount Lemmon || Mount Lemmon Survey || — || align=right | 1.1 km || 
|-id=122 bgcolor=#fefefe
| 378122 ||  || — || October 16, 2006 || Catalina || CSS || — || align=right data-sort-value="0.77" | 770 m || 
|-id=123 bgcolor=#fefefe
| 378123 ||  || — || October 28, 2006 || Mount Lemmon || Mount Lemmon Survey || NYS || align=right data-sort-value="0.54" | 540 m || 
|-id=124 bgcolor=#FFC2E0
| 378124 ||  || — || November 11, 2006 || Kitt Peak || Spacewatch || APO +1km || align=right data-sort-value="0.82" | 820 m || 
|-id=125 bgcolor=#fefefe
| 378125 ||  || — || September 30, 2006 || Mount Lemmon || Mount Lemmon Survey || — || align=right data-sort-value="0.75" | 750 m || 
|-id=126 bgcolor=#fefefe
| 378126 ||  || — || September 30, 2006 || Mount Lemmon || Mount Lemmon Survey || NYS || align=right data-sort-value="0.65" | 650 m || 
|-id=127 bgcolor=#fefefe
| 378127 ||  || — || November 11, 2006 || Mount Lemmon || Mount Lemmon Survey || FLO || align=right data-sort-value="0.58" | 580 m || 
|-id=128 bgcolor=#E9E9E9
| 378128 ||  || — || November 9, 2006 || Kitt Peak || Spacewatch || — || align=right | 1.5 km || 
|-id=129 bgcolor=#fefefe
| 378129 ||  || — || September 27, 2006 || Mount Lemmon || Mount Lemmon Survey || — || align=right data-sort-value="0.69" | 690 m || 
|-id=130 bgcolor=#fefefe
| 378130 ||  || — || November 9, 2006 || Kitt Peak || Spacewatch || MAS || align=right data-sort-value="0.79" | 790 m || 
|-id=131 bgcolor=#fefefe
| 378131 ||  || — || November 9, 2006 || Kitt Peak || Spacewatch || — || align=right data-sort-value="0.74" | 740 m || 
|-id=132 bgcolor=#fefefe
| 378132 ||  || — || November 10, 2006 || Kitt Peak || Spacewatch || NYS || align=right data-sort-value="0.69" | 690 m || 
|-id=133 bgcolor=#fefefe
| 378133 ||  || — || November 10, 2006 || Kitt Peak || Spacewatch || V || align=right data-sort-value="0.85" | 850 m || 
|-id=134 bgcolor=#fefefe
| 378134 ||  || — || November 11, 2006 || Mount Lemmon || Mount Lemmon Survey || — || align=right data-sort-value="0.71" | 710 m || 
|-id=135 bgcolor=#fefefe
| 378135 ||  || — || September 30, 2006 || Mount Lemmon || Mount Lemmon Survey || FLO || align=right data-sort-value="0.57" | 570 m || 
|-id=136 bgcolor=#d6d6d6
| 378136 ||  || — || September 30, 2006 || Mount Lemmon || Mount Lemmon Survey || — || align=right | 2.3 km || 
|-id=137 bgcolor=#fefefe
| 378137 ||  || — || November 12, 2006 || Mount Lemmon || Mount Lemmon Survey || MAS || align=right data-sort-value="0.88" | 880 m || 
|-id=138 bgcolor=#fefefe
| 378138 ||  || — || October 19, 2006 || Mount Lemmon || Mount Lemmon Survey || — || align=right data-sort-value="0.87" | 870 m || 
|-id=139 bgcolor=#fefefe
| 378139 ||  || — || November 9, 2006 || Kitt Peak || Spacewatch || NYS || align=right data-sort-value="0.74" | 740 m || 
|-id=140 bgcolor=#fefefe
| 378140 ||  || — || November 11, 2006 || Kitt Peak || Spacewatch || V || align=right data-sort-value="0.66" | 660 m || 
|-id=141 bgcolor=#fefefe
| 378141 ||  || — || November 11, 2006 || Kitt Peak || Spacewatch || — || align=right data-sort-value="0.75" | 750 m || 
|-id=142 bgcolor=#fefefe
| 378142 ||  || — || November 12, 2006 || Mount Lemmon || Mount Lemmon Survey || V || align=right data-sort-value="0.60" | 600 m || 
|-id=143 bgcolor=#fefefe
| 378143 ||  || — || November 12, 2006 || Mount Lemmon || Mount Lemmon Survey || — || align=right data-sort-value="0.65" | 650 m || 
|-id=144 bgcolor=#fefefe
| 378144 ||  || — || November 12, 2006 || Mount Lemmon || Mount Lemmon Survey || — || align=right data-sort-value="0.72" | 720 m || 
|-id=145 bgcolor=#fefefe
| 378145 ||  || — || October 13, 2006 || Kitt Peak || Spacewatch || — || align=right data-sort-value="0.89" | 890 m || 
|-id=146 bgcolor=#fefefe
| 378146 ||  || — || November 14, 2006 || Kitt Peak || Spacewatch || — || align=right | 1.1 km || 
|-id=147 bgcolor=#fefefe
| 378147 ||  || — || October 23, 2006 || Kitt Peak || Spacewatch || — || align=right data-sort-value="0.78" | 780 m || 
|-id=148 bgcolor=#fefefe
| 378148 ||  || — || September 27, 2006 || Mount Lemmon || Mount Lemmon Survey || — || align=right data-sort-value="0.84" | 840 m || 
|-id=149 bgcolor=#fefefe
| 378149 ||  || — || September 28, 2006 || Mount Lemmon || Mount Lemmon Survey || — || align=right data-sort-value="0.85" | 850 m || 
|-id=150 bgcolor=#E9E9E9
| 378150 ||  || — || September 27, 2006 || Mount Lemmon || Mount Lemmon Survey || MAR || align=right | 1.0 km || 
|-id=151 bgcolor=#fefefe
| 378151 ||  || — || November 14, 2006 || Kitt Peak || Spacewatch || — || align=right data-sort-value="0.67" | 670 m || 
|-id=152 bgcolor=#fefefe
| 378152 ||  || — || November 14, 2006 || Kitt Peak || Spacewatch || MAS || align=right data-sort-value="0.49" | 490 m || 
|-id=153 bgcolor=#fefefe
| 378153 ||  || — || November 15, 2006 || Kitt Peak || Spacewatch || — || align=right data-sort-value="0.75" | 750 m || 
|-id=154 bgcolor=#fefefe
| 378154 ||  || — || November 15, 2006 || Kitt Peak || Spacewatch || V || align=right data-sort-value="0.80" | 800 m || 
|-id=155 bgcolor=#fefefe
| 378155 ||  || — || November 15, 2006 || Kitt Peak || Spacewatch || MAS || align=right data-sort-value="0.73" | 730 m || 
|-id=156 bgcolor=#fefefe
| 378156 ||  || — || November 15, 2006 || Mount Lemmon || Mount Lemmon Survey || FLO || align=right data-sort-value="0.47" | 470 m || 
|-id=157 bgcolor=#fefefe
| 378157 ||  || — || November 9, 2006 || Palomar || NEAT || V || align=right data-sort-value="0.70" | 700 m || 
|-id=158 bgcolor=#fefefe
| 378158 ||  || — || November 8, 2006 || Palomar || NEAT || V || align=right data-sort-value="0.89" | 890 m || 
|-id=159 bgcolor=#fefefe
| 378159 ||  || — || November 11, 2006 || Mount Lemmon || Mount Lemmon Survey || — || align=right data-sort-value="0.93" | 930 m || 
|-id=160 bgcolor=#FFC2E0
| 378160 ||  || — || November 19, 2006 || Catalina || CSS || ATEPHA || align=right data-sort-value="0.43" | 430 m || 
|-id=161 bgcolor=#fefefe
| 378161 ||  || — || November 18, 2006 || Socorro || LINEAR || — || align=right | 1.1 km || 
|-id=162 bgcolor=#fefefe
| 378162 ||  || — || November 16, 2006 || Kitt Peak || Spacewatch || PHO || align=right data-sort-value="0.96" | 960 m || 
|-id=163 bgcolor=#fefefe
| 378163 ||  || — || November 16, 2006 || Socorro || LINEAR || PHO || align=right | 1.1 km || 
|-id=164 bgcolor=#fefefe
| 378164 ||  || — || November 16, 2006 || Kitt Peak || Spacewatch || V || align=right data-sort-value="0.83" | 830 m || 
|-id=165 bgcolor=#fefefe
| 378165 ||  || — || November 16, 2006 || Mount Lemmon || Mount Lemmon Survey || — || align=right data-sort-value="0.70" | 700 m || 
|-id=166 bgcolor=#fefefe
| 378166 ||  || — || November 16, 2006 || Mount Lemmon || Mount Lemmon Survey || FLO || align=right data-sort-value="0.60" | 600 m || 
|-id=167 bgcolor=#fefefe
| 378167 ||  || — || November 16, 2006 || Kitt Peak || Spacewatch || — || align=right data-sort-value="0.85" | 850 m || 
|-id=168 bgcolor=#fefefe
| 378168 ||  || — || October 23, 2006 || Mount Lemmon || Mount Lemmon Survey || — || align=right data-sort-value="0.77" | 770 m || 
|-id=169 bgcolor=#fefefe
| 378169 ||  || — || November 18, 2006 || Kitt Peak || Spacewatch || NYS || align=right data-sort-value="0.66" | 660 m || 
|-id=170 bgcolor=#fefefe
| 378170 ||  || — || November 18, 2006 || Kitt Peak || Spacewatch || FLO || align=right data-sort-value="0.61" | 610 m || 
|-id=171 bgcolor=#fefefe
| 378171 ||  || — || November 18, 2006 || Kitt Peak || Spacewatch || NYS || align=right data-sort-value="0.64" | 640 m || 
|-id=172 bgcolor=#fefefe
| 378172 ||  || — || October 19, 2006 || Mount Lemmon || Mount Lemmon Survey || — || align=right data-sort-value="0.99" | 990 m || 
|-id=173 bgcolor=#fefefe
| 378173 ||  || — || November 19, 2006 || Kitt Peak || Spacewatch || FLO || align=right data-sort-value="0.64" | 640 m || 
|-id=174 bgcolor=#fefefe
| 378174 ||  || — || November 19, 2006 || Kitt Peak || Spacewatch || — || align=right data-sort-value="0.75" | 750 m || 
|-id=175 bgcolor=#fefefe
| 378175 ||  || — || November 23, 2006 || Mount Lemmon || Mount Lemmon Survey || — || align=right data-sort-value="0.90" | 900 m || 
|-id=176 bgcolor=#fefefe
| 378176 ||  || — || November 23, 2006 || Kitt Peak || Spacewatch || V || align=right data-sort-value="0.53" | 530 m || 
|-id=177 bgcolor=#fefefe
| 378177 ||  || — || November 23, 2006 || Kitt Peak || Spacewatch || NYS || align=right data-sort-value="0.53" | 530 m || 
|-id=178 bgcolor=#fefefe
| 378178 ||  || — || November 23, 2006 || Kitt Peak || Spacewatch || — || align=right data-sort-value="0.68" | 680 m || 
|-id=179 bgcolor=#fefefe
| 378179 ||  || — || November 24, 2006 || Mount Lemmon || Mount Lemmon Survey || NYS || align=right data-sort-value="0.60" | 600 m || 
|-id=180 bgcolor=#fefefe
| 378180 ||  || — || November 25, 2006 || Mount Lemmon || Mount Lemmon Survey || NYS || align=right data-sort-value="0.60" | 600 m || 
|-id=181 bgcolor=#fefefe
| 378181 ||  || — || November 27, 2006 || Mount Lemmon || Mount Lemmon Survey || NYS || align=right data-sort-value="0.68" | 680 m || 
|-id=182 bgcolor=#fefefe
| 378182 ||  || — || November 27, 2006 || Mount Lemmon || Mount Lemmon Survey || — || align=right | 2.2 km || 
|-id=183 bgcolor=#fefefe
| 378183 ||  || — || December 9, 2006 || Kitt Peak || Spacewatch || — || align=right data-sort-value="0.98" | 980 m || 
|-id=184 bgcolor=#fefefe
| 378184 ||  || — || November 18, 2006 || Kitt Peak || Spacewatch || NYS || align=right data-sort-value="0.69" | 690 m || 
|-id=185 bgcolor=#fefefe
| 378185 ||  || — || December 10, 2006 || Kitt Peak || Spacewatch || V || align=right data-sort-value="0.63" | 630 m || 
|-id=186 bgcolor=#d6d6d6
| 378186 ||  || — || December 10, 2006 || Kitt Peak || Spacewatch || HIL3:2 || align=right | 6.4 km || 
|-id=187 bgcolor=#fefefe
| 378187 ||  || — || December 10, 2006 || Kitt Peak || Spacewatch || V || align=right data-sort-value="0.78" | 780 m || 
|-id=188 bgcolor=#fefefe
| 378188 ||  || — || November 19, 2006 || Kitt Peak || Spacewatch || — || align=right | 1.0 km || 
|-id=189 bgcolor=#fefefe
| 378189 ||  || — || December 13, 2006 || Mount Lemmon || Mount Lemmon Survey || — || align=right data-sort-value="0.86" | 860 m || 
|-id=190 bgcolor=#fefefe
| 378190 ||  || — || December 11, 2006 || Kitt Peak || Spacewatch || NYS || align=right data-sort-value="0.56" | 560 m || 
|-id=191 bgcolor=#fefefe
| 378191 ||  || — || December 11, 2006 || Kitt Peak || Spacewatch || NYS || align=right data-sort-value="0.60" | 600 m || 
|-id=192 bgcolor=#fefefe
| 378192 ||  || — || December 12, 2006 || Mount Lemmon || Mount Lemmon Survey || NYS || align=right data-sort-value="0.71" | 710 m || 
|-id=193 bgcolor=#fefefe
| 378193 ||  || — || December 13, 2006 || Kitt Peak || Spacewatch || MAS || align=right data-sort-value="0.60" | 600 m || 
|-id=194 bgcolor=#fefefe
| 378194 ||  || — || December 14, 2006 || Catalina || CSS || — || align=right | 1.1 km || 
|-id=195 bgcolor=#fefefe
| 378195 ||  || — || December 15, 2006 || Socorro || LINEAR || — || align=right data-sort-value="0.92" | 920 m || 
|-id=196 bgcolor=#fefefe
| 378196 ||  || — || December 14, 2006 || Kitt Peak || Spacewatch || — || align=right data-sort-value="0.75" | 750 m || 
|-id=197 bgcolor=#fefefe
| 378197 ||  || — || December 13, 2006 || Kitt Peak || Spacewatch || — || align=right | 1.1 km || 
|-id=198 bgcolor=#fefefe
| 378198 ||  || — || October 22, 2006 || Mount Lemmon || Mount Lemmon Survey || — || align=right data-sort-value="0.84" | 840 m || 
|-id=199 bgcolor=#fefefe
| 378199 ||  || — || December 21, 2006 || Kitt Peak || Spacewatch || V || align=right data-sort-value="0.83" | 830 m || 
|-id=200 bgcolor=#fefefe
| 378200 ||  || — || December 10, 2006 || Kitt Peak || Spacewatch || NYS || align=right data-sort-value="0.98" | 980 m || 
|}

378201–378300 

|-bgcolor=#fefefe
| 378201 ||  || — || December 21, 2006 || Kitt Peak || Spacewatch || V || align=right data-sort-value="0.84" | 840 m || 
|-id=202 bgcolor=#fefefe
| 378202 ||  || — || November 22, 2006 || Mount Lemmon || Mount Lemmon Survey || NYS || align=right data-sort-value="0.69" | 690 m || 
|-id=203 bgcolor=#fefefe
| 378203 ||  || — || December 23, 2006 || Mount Lemmon || Mount Lemmon Survey || — || align=right data-sort-value="0.65" | 650 m || 
|-id=204 bgcolor=#fefefe
| 378204 Bettyhesser ||  ||  || December 26, 2006 || Mauna Kea || D. D. Balam || — || align=right data-sort-value="0.89" | 890 m || 
|-id=205 bgcolor=#fefefe
| 378205 ||  || — || December 28, 2006 || Pla D'Arguines || R. Ferrando || — || align=right data-sort-value="0.97" | 970 m || 
|-id=206 bgcolor=#E9E9E9
| 378206 ||  || — || December 24, 2006 || Mount Lemmon || Mount Lemmon Survey || — || align=right | 2.2 km || 
|-id=207 bgcolor=#fefefe
| 378207 ||  || — || January 8, 2007 || Mount Lemmon || Mount Lemmon Survey || MAS || align=right data-sort-value="0.88" | 880 m || 
|-id=208 bgcolor=#fefefe
| 378208 ||  || — || January 8, 2007 || Mount Lemmon || Mount Lemmon Survey || — || align=right | 1.2 km || 
|-id=209 bgcolor=#fefefe
| 378209 ||  || — || January 8, 2007 || Catalina || CSS || — || align=right data-sort-value="0.92" | 920 m || 
|-id=210 bgcolor=#fefefe
| 378210 ||  || — || November 27, 2006 || Mount Lemmon || Mount Lemmon Survey || — || align=right | 1.0 km || 
|-id=211 bgcolor=#fefefe
| 378211 ||  || — || January 13, 2007 || Pla D'Arguines || R. Ferrando || — || align=right data-sort-value="0.78" | 780 m || 
|-id=212 bgcolor=#fefefe
| 378212 ||  || — || January 8, 2007 || Kitt Peak || Spacewatch || — || align=right data-sort-value="0.99" | 990 m || 
|-id=213 bgcolor=#fefefe
| 378213 ||  || — || January 10, 2007 || Mount Lemmon || Mount Lemmon Survey || ERI || align=right | 1.9 km || 
|-id=214 bgcolor=#FA8072
| 378214 Sauron ||  ||  || January 14, 2007 || Taunus || E. Schwab, R. Kling || — || align=right data-sort-value="0.86" | 860 m || 
|-id=215 bgcolor=#fefefe
| 378215 ||  || — || January 9, 2007 || Mount Lemmon || Mount Lemmon Survey || — || align=right data-sort-value="0.85" | 850 m || 
|-id=216 bgcolor=#fefefe
| 378216 ||  || — || July 16, 2001 || Socorro || LINEAR || PHO || align=right | 1.9 km || 
|-id=217 bgcolor=#fefefe
| 378217 ||  || — || December 24, 2006 || Kitt Peak || Spacewatch || — || align=right | 1.4 km || 
|-id=218 bgcolor=#fefefe
| 378218 ||  || — || January 17, 2007 || Kitt Peak || Spacewatch || — || align=right data-sort-value="0.97" | 970 m || 
|-id=219 bgcolor=#fefefe
| 378219 ||  || — || January 17, 2007 || Palomar || NEAT || MAS || align=right data-sort-value="0.93" | 930 m || 
|-id=220 bgcolor=#fefefe
| 378220 ||  || — || December 21, 2006 || Kitt Peak || Spacewatch || — || align=right | 1.3 km || 
|-id=221 bgcolor=#fefefe
| 378221 ||  || — || January 17, 2007 || Palomar || NEAT || — || align=right data-sort-value="0.90" | 900 m || 
|-id=222 bgcolor=#fefefe
| 378222 ||  || — || December 9, 2002 || Kitt Peak || Spacewatch || V || align=right data-sort-value="0.95" | 950 m || 
|-id=223 bgcolor=#fefefe
| 378223 ||  || — || January 24, 2007 || Socorro || LINEAR || NYS || align=right data-sort-value="0.73" | 730 m || 
|-id=224 bgcolor=#fefefe
| 378224 ||  || — || January 24, 2007 || Socorro || LINEAR || — || align=right data-sort-value="0.95" | 950 m || 
|-id=225 bgcolor=#fefefe
| 378225 ||  || — || January 24, 2007 || Catalina || CSS || — || align=right data-sort-value="0.67" | 670 m || 
|-id=226 bgcolor=#fefefe
| 378226 ||  || — || December 27, 2006 || Mount Lemmon || Mount Lemmon Survey || NYS || align=right data-sort-value="0.72" | 720 m || 
|-id=227 bgcolor=#fefefe
| 378227 ||  || — || January 24, 2007 || Socorro || LINEAR || — || align=right data-sort-value="0.73" | 730 m || 
|-id=228 bgcolor=#fefefe
| 378228 ||  || — || January 24, 2007 || Catalina || CSS || V || align=right data-sort-value="0.76" | 760 m || 
|-id=229 bgcolor=#fefefe
| 378229 ||  || — || January 24, 2007 || Socorro || LINEAR || NYS || align=right data-sort-value="0.66" | 660 m || 
|-id=230 bgcolor=#E9E9E9
| 378230 ||  || — || January 27, 2007 || Mount Lemmon || Mount Lemmon Survey || RAF || align=right data-sort-value="0.83" | 830 m || 
|-id=231 bgcolor=#fefefe
| 378231 ||  || — || January 17, 2007 || Palomar || NEAT || V || align=right data-sort-value="0.68" | 680 m || 
|-id=232 bgcolor=#fefefe
| 378232 ||  || — || January 17, 2007 || Kitt Peak || Spacewatch || NYS || align=right data-sort-value="0.61" | 610 m || 
|-id=233 bgcolor=#fefefe
| 378233 ||  || — || January 24, 2007 || Catalina || CSS || NYS || align=right data-sort-value="0.72" | 720 m || 
|-id=234 bgcolor=#E9E9E9
| 378234 ||  || — || January 27, 2007 || Kitt Peak || Spacewatch || — || align=right | 1.5 km || 
|-id=235 bgcolor=#fefefe
| 378235 ||  || — || January 19, 2007 || Mauna Kea || Mauna Kea Obs. || — || align=right data-sort-value="0.85" | 850 m || 
|-id=236 bgcolor=#fefefe
| 378236 ||  || — || January 27, 2007 || Kitt Peak || Spacewatch || — || align=right data-sort-value="0.98" | 980 m || 
|-id=237 bgcolor=#E9E9E9
| 378237 ||  || — || January 10, 2007 || Mount Lemmon || Mount Lemmon Survey || — || align=right | 1.1 km || 
|-id=238 bgcolor=#fefefe
| 378238 ||  || — || January 10, 2007 || Mount Lemmon || Mount Lemmon Survey || MAS || align=right data-sort-value="0.75" | 750 m || 
|-id=239 bgcolor=#fefefe
| 378239 ||  || — || January 17, 2007 || Mount Lemmon || Mount Lemmon Survey || NYS || align=right data-sort-value="0.71" | 710 m || 
|-id=240 bgcolor=#fefefe
| 378240 ||  || — || November 27, 2006 || Mount Lemmon || Mount Lemmon Survey || — || align=right data-sort-value="0.75" | 750 m || 
|-id=241 bgcolor=#fefefe
| 378241 ||  || — || February 6, 2007 || Mount Lemmon || Mount Lemmon Survey || NYS || align=right data-sort-value="0.63" | 630 m || 
|-id=242 bgcolor=#fefefe
| 378242 ||  || — || February 6, 2007 || Mount Lemmon || Mount Lemmon Survey || NYS || align=right data-sort-value="0.76" | 760 m || 
|-id=243 bgcolor=#fefefe
| 378243 ||  || — || February 6, 2007 || Mount Lemmon || Mount Lemmon Survey || — || align=right data-sort-value="0.90" | 900 m || 
|-id=244 bgcolor=#fefefe
| 378244 ||  || — || February 6, 2007 || Mount Lemmon || Mount Lemmon Survey || MAS || align=right data-sort-value="0.72" | 720 m || 
|-id=245 bgcolor=#E9E9E9
| 378245 ||  || — || February 7, 2007 || Kitt Peak || Spacewatch || — || align=right | 1.4 km || 
|-id=246 bgcolor=#fefefe
| 378246 ||  || — || January 17, 2007 || Kitt Peak || Spacewatch || NYS || align=right data-sort-value="0.63" | 630 m || 
|-id=247 bgcolor=#fefefe
| 378247 ||  || — || February 15, 2007 || Catalina || CSS || — || align=right | 1.00 km || 
|-id=248 bgcolor=#E9E9E9
| 378248 ||  || — || December 27, 2006 || Mount Lemmon || Mount Lemmon Survey || — || align=right | 2.4 km || 
|-id=249 bgcolor=#fefefe
| 378249 ||  || — || February 16, 2007 || Mount Lemmon || Mount Lemmon Survey || — || align=right data-sort-value="0.74" | 740 m || 
|-id=250 bgcolor=#fefefe
| 378250 ||  || — || February 17, 2007 || Palomar || NEAT || — || align=right | 1.2 km || 
|-id=251 bgcolor=#C2FFFF
| 378251 ||  || — || February 17, 2007 || Kitt Peak || Spacewatch || L5ENM || align=right | 8.5 km || 
|-id=252 bgcolor=#E9E9E9
| 378252 ||  || — || February 17, 2007 || Kitt Peak || Spacewatch || POS || align=right | 2.7 km || 
|-id=253 bgcolor=#E9E9E9
| 378253 ||  || — || February 17, 2007 || Kitt Peak || Spacewatch || — || align=right | 2.8 km || 
|-id=254 bgcolor=#fefefe
| 378254 ||  || — || February 17, 2007 || Kitt Peak || Spacewatch || NYS || align=right data-sort-value="0.67" | 670 m || 
|-id=255 bgcolor=#E9E9E9
| 378255 ||  || — || February 17, 2007 || Kitt Peak || Spacewatch || — || align=right | 2.3 km || 
|-id=256 bgcolor=#fefefe
| 378256 ||  || — || February 17, 2007 || Kitt Peak || Spacewatch || — || align=right data-sort-value="0.82" | 820 m || 
|-id=257 bgcolor=#E9E9E9
| 378257 ||  || — || February 21, 2007 || Mount Lemmon || Mount Lemmon Survey || — || align=right | 4.4 km || 
|-id=258 bgcolor=#E9E9E9
| 378258 ||  || — || October 25, 2005 || Mount Lemmon || Mount Lemmon Survey || — || align=right data-sort-value="0.87" | 870 m || 
|-id=259 bgcolor=#E9E9E9
| 378259 ||  || — || February 21, 2007 || Kitt Peak || Spacewatch || — || align=right | 2.5 km || 
|-id=260 bgcolor=#fefefe
| 378260 ||  || — || February 21, 2007 || Kitt Peak || Spacewatch || — || align=right data-sort-value="0.71" | 710 m || 
|-id=261 bgcolor=#E9E9E9
| 378261 ||  || — || February 23, 2007 || Catalina || CSS || — || align=right | 2.0 km || 
|-id=262 bgcolor=#E9E9E9
| 378262 ||  || — || February 26, 2007 || Mount Lemmon || Mount Lemmon Survey || — || align=right | 1.0 km || 
|-id=263 bgcolor=#fefefe
| 378263 ||  || — || February 21, 2007 || Kitt Peak || M. W. Buie || — || align=right data-sort-value="0.80" | 800 m || 
|-id=264 bgcolor=#fefefe
| 378264 ||  || — || February 25, 2007 || Kitt Peak || Spacewatch || MAS || align=right data-sort-value="0.74" | 740 m || 
|-id=265 bgcolor=#E9E9E9
| 378265 ||  || — || February 16, 2007 || Mount Lemmon || Mount Lemmon Survey || — || align=right | 1.9 km || 
|-id=266 bgcolor=#E9E9E9
| 378266 ||  || — || March 10, 2007 || Wrightwood || J. W. Young || — || align=right | 1.0 km || 
|-id=267 bgcolor=#E9E9E9
| 378267 ||  || — || March 10, 2007 || Saint-Sulpice || B. Christophe || — || align=right data-sort-value="0.92" | 920 m || 
|-id=268 bgcolor=#fefefe
| 378268 ||  || — || March 9, 2007 || Palomar || NEAT || V || align=right data-sort-value="0.84" | 840 m || 
|-id=269 bgcolor=#fefefe
| 378269 ||  || — || March 9, 2007 || Mount Lemmon || Mount Lemmon Survey || MAS || align=right data-sort-value="0.75" | 750 m || 
|-id=270 bgcolor=#fefefe
| 378270 ||  || — || March 10, 2007 || Kitt Peak || Spacewatch || 417 || align=right data-sort-value="0.84" | 840 m || 
|-id=271 bgcolor=#E9E9E9
| 378271 ||  || — || March 10, 2007 || Kitt Peak || Spacewatch || — || align=right data-sort-value="0.86" | 860 m || 
|-id=272 bgcolor=#E9E9E9
| 378272 ||  || — || March 12, 2007 || Bergisch Gladbach || W. Bickel || MRX || align=right | 1.2 km || 
|-id=273 bgcolor=#C2FFFF
| 378273 ||  || — || March 10, 2007 || Kitt Peak || Spacewatch || L5 || align=right | 8.6 km || 
|-id=274 bgcolor=#fefefe
| 378274 ||  || — || February 17, 2007 || Catalina || CSS || H || align=right data-sort-value="0.77" | 770 m || 
|-id=275 bgcolor=#C2FFFF
| 378275 ||  || — || February 22, 2007 || Kitt Peak || Spacewatch || L5 || align=right | 8.9 km || 
|-id=276 bgcolor=#E9E9E9
| 378276 ||  || — || March 10, 2007 || Kitt Peak || Spacewatch || — || align=right | 1.3 km || 
|-id=277 bgcolor=#E9E9E9
| 378277 ||  || — || March 10, 2007 || Kitt Peak || Spacewatch || — || align=right | 3.2 km || 
|-id=278 bgcolor=#E9E9E9
| 378278 ||  || — || March 10, 2007 || Kitt Peak || Spacewatch || — || align=right data-sort-value="0.98" | 980 m || 
|-id=279 bgcolor=#fefefe
| 378279 ||  || — || March 12, 2007 || Kitt Peak || Spacewatch || H || align=right data-sort-value="0.57" | 570 m || 
|-id=280 bgcolor=#fefefe
| 378280 ||  || — || March 9, 2007 || Kitt Peak || Spacewatch || MAS || align=right data-sort-value="0.65" | 650 m || 
|-id=281 bgcolor=#E9E9E9
| 378281 ||  || — || March 9, 2007 || Kitt Peak || Spacewatch || — || align=right | 1.3 km || 
|-id=282 bgcolor=#fefefe
| 378282 ||  || — || March 9, 2007 || Catalina || CSS || H || align=right data-sort-value="0.50" | 500 m || 
|-id=283 bgcolor=#E9E9E9
| 378283 ||  || — || March 13, 2007 || Mount Lemmon || Mount Lemmon Survey || — || align=right | 2.2 km || 
|-id=284 bgcolor=#E9E9E9
| 378284 ||  || — || March 13, 2007 || Mount Lemmon || Mount Lemmon Survey || — || align=right | 2.6 km || 
|-id=285 bgcolor=#E9E9E9
| 378285 ||  || — || March 13, 2007 || Mount Lemmon || Mount Lemmon Survey || — || align=right | 1.5 km || 
|-id=286 bgcolor=#E9E9E9
| 378286 ||  || — || April 30, 2003 || Kitt Peak || Spacewatch || — || align=right | 2.5 km || 
|-id=287 bgcolor=#fefefe
| 378287 ||  || — || March 9, 2007 || Mount Lemmon || Mount Lemmon Survey || — || align=right data-sort-value="0.78" | 780 m || 
|-id=288 bgcolor=#E9E9E9
| 378288 ||  || — || March 9, 2007 || Mount Lemmon || Mount Lemmon Survey || — || align=right | 1.6 km || 
|-id=289 bgcolor=#E9E9E9
| 378289 ||  || — || March 9, 2007 || Mount Lemmon || Mount Lemmon Survey || — || align=right data-sort-value="0.94" | 940 m || 
|-id=290 bgcolor=#E9E9E9
| 378290 ||  || — || March 10, 2007 || Mount Lemmon || Mount Lemmon Survey || — || align=right | 2.8 km || 
|-id=291 bgcolor=#fefefe
| 378291 ||  || — || February 26, 2007 || Mount Lemmon || Mount Lemmon Survey || — || align=right data-sort-value="0.80" | 800 m || 
|-id=292 bgcolor=#E9E9E9
| 378292 ||  || — || March 12, 2007 || Mount Lemmon || Mount Lemmon Survey || — || align=right | 1.1 km || 
|-id=293 bgcolor=#E9E9E9
| 378293 ||  || — || March 12, 2007 || Mount Lemmon || Mount Lemmon Survey || — || align=right | 1.3 km || 
|-id=294 bgcolor=#E9E9E9
| 378294 ||  || — || March 13, 2007 || Mount Lemmon || Mount Lemmon Survey || — || align=right | 1.1 km || 
|-id=295 bgcolor=#fefefe
| 378295 ||  || — || March 13, 2007 || Mount Lemmon || Mount Lemmon Survey || NYS || align=right data-sort-value="0.69" | 690 m || 
|-id=296 bgcolor=#E9E9E9
| 378296 ||  || — || March 13, 2007 || Kitt Peak || Spacewatch || — || align=right | 1.1 km || 
|-id=297 bgcolor=#E9E9E9
| 378297 ||  || — || March 14, 2007 || Kitt Peak || Spacewatch || — || align=right | 1.1 km || 
|-id=298 bgcolor=#E9E9E9
| 378298 ||  || — || March 14, 2007 || Kitt Peak || Spacewatch || HNS || align=right | 1.3 km || 
|-id=299 bgcolor=#E9E9E9
| 378299 ||  || — || March 14, 2007 || Kitt Peak || Spacewatch || JUN || align=right | 1.5 km || 
|-id=300 bgcolor=#E9E9E9
| 378300 ||  || — || March 13, 2007 || Kitt Peak || Spacewatch || — || align=right | 2.6 km || 
|}

378301–378400 

|-bgcolor=#E9E9E9
| 378301 ||  || — || March 12, 2007 || Catalina || CSS || ADE || align=right | 1.8 km || 
|-id=302 bgcolor=#E9E9E9
| 378302 ||  || — || March 8, 2007 || Palomar || NEAT || — || align=right | 1.4 km || 
|-id=303 bgcolor=#E9E9E9
| 378303 ||  || — || March 11, 2007 || Mount Lemmon || Mount Lemmon Survey || — || align=right | 1.9 km || 
|-id=304 bgcolor=#C2FFFF
| 378304 ||  || — || March 11, 2007 || Mount Lemmon || Mount Lemmon Survey || L5ENM || align=right | 8.3 km || 
|-id=305 bgcolor=#FA8072
| 378305 ||  || — || March 18, 2007 || Catalina || CSS || — || align=right data-sort-value="0.79" | 790 m || 
|-id=306 bgcolor=#E9E9E9
| 378306 ||  || — || March 16, 2007 || Kitt Peak || Spacewatch || JUN || align=right | 1.2 km || 
|-id=307 bgcolor=#E9E9E9
| 378307 ||  || — || March 18, 2007 || Kitt Peak || Spacewatch || — || align=right data-sort-value="0.90" | 900 m || 
|-id=308 bgcolor=#E9E9E9
| 378308 ||  || — || March 19, 2007 || Mount Lemmon || Mount Lemmon Survey || — || align=right | 3.1 km || 
|-id=309 bgcolor=#fefefe
| 378309 ||  || — || March 20, 2007 || Mount Lemmon || Mount Lemmon Survey || — || align=right data-sort-value="0.77" | 770 m || 
|-id=310 bgcolor=#E9E9E9
| 378310 ||  || — || March 20, 2007 || Kitt Peak || Spacewatch || — || align=right data-sort-value="0.98" | 980 m || 
|-id=311 bgcolor=#E9E9E9
| 378311 ||  || — || March 26, 2007 || Kitt Peak || Spacewatch || — || align=right | 3.0 km || 
|-id=312 bgcolor=#E9E9E9
| 378312 ||  || — || March 16, 2007 || Mount Lemmon || Mount Lemmon Survey || — || align=right | 1.6 km || 
|-id=313 bgcolor=#E9E9E9
| 378313 ||  || — || March 20, 2007 || Mount Lemmon || Mount Lemmon Survey || — || align=right | 1.6 km || 
|-id=314 bgcolor=#E9E9E9
| 378314 ||  || — || March 18, 2007 || Kitt Peak || Spacewatch || — || align=right | 3.4 km || 
|-id=315 bgcolor=#E9E9E9
| 378315 ||  || — || March 26, 2007 || Mount Lemmon || Mount Lemmon Survey || — || align=right | 1.5 km || 
|-id=316 bgcolor=#E9E9E9
| 378316 ||  || — || March 20, 2007 || Catalina || CSS || — || align=right | 2.4 km || 
|-id=317 bgcolor=#E9E9E9
| 378317 ||  || — || March 25, 2007 || Mount Lemmon || Mount Lemmon Survey || KON || align=right | 3.4 km || 
|-id=318 bgcolor=#E9E9E9
| 378318 ||  || — || April 11, 2007 || Catalina || CSS || — || align=right | 3.1 km || 
|-id=319 bgcolor=#E9E9E9
| 378319 ||  || — || April 14, 2007 || Bergisch Gladbac || W. Bickel || — || align=right | 1.00 km || 
|-id=320 bgcolor=#E9E9E9
| 378320 ||  || — || March 17, 2007 || Anderson Mesa || LONEOS || — || align=right | 2.4 km || 
|-id=321 bgcolor=#E9E9E9
| 378321 ||  || — || April 11, 2007 || Kitt Peak || Spacewatch || — || align=right | 3.2 km || 
|-id=322 bgcolor=#E9E9E9
| 378322 ||  || — || April 14, 2007 || Kitt Peak || Spacewatch || — || align=right | 2.7 km || 
|-id=323 bgcolor=#E9E9E9
| 378323 ||  || — || April 14, 2007 || Kitt Peak || Spacewatch || — || align=right | 1.4 km || 
|-id=324 bgcolor=#E9E9E9
| 378324 ||  || — || April 14, 2007 || Kitt Peak || Spacewatch || AGN || align=right | 1.5 km || 
|-id=325 bgcolor=#E9E9E9
| 378325 ||  || — || April 14, 2007 || Kitt Peak || Spacewatch || — || align=right | 1.8 km || 
|-id=326 bgcolor=#E9E9E9
| 378326 ||  || — || April 14, 2007 || Kitt Peak || Spacewatch || — || align=right | 1.3 km || 
|-id=327 bgcolor=#E9E9E9
| 378327 ||  || — || April 14, 2007 || Kitt Peak || Spacewatch || ADE || align=right | 1.8 km || 
|-id=328 bgcolor=#E9E9E9
| 378328 ||  || — || April 15, 2007 || Kitt Peak || Spacewatch || — || align=right | 1.7 km || 
|-id=329 bgcolor=#E9E9E9
| 378329 ||  || — || April 15, 2007 || Kitt Peak || Spacewatch || — || align=right | 2.1 km || 
|-id=330 bgcolor=#E9E9E9
| 378330 ||  || — || April 15, 2007 || Kitt Peak || Spacewatch || AGN || align=right | 1.2 km || 
|-id=331 bgcolor=#E9E9E9
| 378331 ||  || — || April 15, 2007 || Kitt Peak || Spacewatch || — || align=right | 2.9 km || 
|-id=332 bgcolor=#C2FFFF
| 378332 ||  || — || April 11, 2007 || Mount Lemmon || Mount Lemmon Survey || L5 || align=right | 7.5 km || 
|-id=333 bgcolor=#E9E9E9
| 378333 ||  || — || March 18, 2007 || Kitt Peak || Spacewatch || — || align=right | 1.2 km || 
|-id=334 bgcolor=#E9E9E9
| 378334 ||  || — || April 18, 2007 || Kitt Peak || Spacewatch || NEM || align=right | 2.5 km || 
|-id=335 bgcolor=#E9E9E9
| 378335 ||  || — || March 26, 2007 || Kitt Peak || Spacewatch || — || align=right | 1.5 km || 
|-id=336 bgcolor=#E9E9E9
| 378336 ||  || — || April 18, 2007 || Catalina || CSS || — || align=right | 1.0 km || 
|-id=337 bgcolor=#E9E9E9
| 378337 ||  || — || April 15, 2007 || Kitt Peak || Spacewatch || KON || align=right | 2.2 km || 
|-id=338 bgcolor=#E9E9E9
| 378338 ||  || — || April 19, 2007 || Kitt Peak || Spacewatch || — || align=right | 2.6 km || 
|-id=339 bgcolor=#E9E9E9
| 378339 ||  || — || April 19, 2007 || Kitt Peak || Spacewatch || RAF || align=right | 1.1 km || 
|-id=340 bgcolor=#E9E9E9
| 378340 ||  || — || April 22, 2007 || Mount Lemmon || Mount Lemmon Survey || — || align=right | 2.3 km || 
|-id=341 bgcolor=#E9E9E9
| 378341 ||  || — || April 20, 2007 || Kitt Peak || Spacewatch || — || align=right | 2.2 km || 
|-id=342 bgcolor=#E9E9E9
| 378342 ||  || — || April 20, 2007 || Kitt Peak || Spacewatch || — || align=right | 1.7 km || 
|-id=343 bgcolor=#E9E9E9
| 378343 ||  || — || November 19, 2004 || Catalina || CSS || — || align=right | 2.8 km || 
|-id=344 bgcolor=#E9E9E9
| 378344 ||  || — || April 18, 2007 || Mount Lemmon || Mount Lemmon Survey || — || align=right | 1.6 km || 
|-id=345 bgcolor=#E9E9E9
| 378345 ||  || — || April 22, 2007 || Mount Lemmon || Mount Lemmon Survey || — || align=right | 2.9 km || 
|-id=346 bgcolor=#E9E9E9
| 378346 ||  || — || April 24, 2007 || Mount Lemmon || Mount Lemmon Survey || — || align=right | 2.9 km || 
|-id=347 bgcolor=#E9E9E9
| 378347 ||  || — || March 16, 2007 || Kitt Peak || Spacewatch || EUN || align=right | 1.4 km || 
|-id=348 bgcolor=#E9E9E9
| 378348 ||  || — || April 22, 2007 || Kitt Peak || Spacewatch || — || align=right | 3.4 km || 
|-id=349 bgcolor=#E9E9E9
| 378349 ||  || — || April 24, 2007 || Kitt Peak || Spacewatch || — || align=right | 2.1 km || 
|-id=350 bgcolor=#E9E9E9
| 378350 ||  || — || April 25, 2007 || Kitt Peak || Spacewatch || — || align=right | 1.9 km || 
|-id=351 bgcolor=#E9E9E9
| 378351 ||  || — || April 19, 2007 || Mount Lemmon || Mount Lemmon Survey || — || align=right | 3.4 km || 
|-id=352 bgcolor=#E9E9E9
| 378352 ||  || — || May 9, 2007 || Mount Lemmon || Mount Lemmon Survey || — || align=right | 3.5 km || 
|-id=353 bgcolor=#E9E9E9
| 378353 ||  || — || May 9, 2007 || Mount Lemmon || Mount Lemmon Survey || — || align=right | 2.7 km || 
|-id=354 bgcolor=#E9E9E9
| 378354 ||  || — || May 8, 2007 || Lulin Observatory || LUSS || — || align=right | 2.0 km || 
|-id=355 bgcolor=#C2FFFF
| 378355 ||  || — || May 18, 2007 || Antares || ARO || L5 || align=right | 14 km || 
|-id=356 bgcolor=#E9E9E9
| 378356 ||  || — || May 19, 2007 || Tiki || S. F. Hönig, N. Teamo || JUN || align=right | 1.1 km || 
|-id=357 bgcolor=#E9E9E9
| 378357 ||  || — || May 23, 2007 || Mount Lemmon || Mount Lemmon Survey || ADE || align=right | 2.4 km || 
|-id=358 bgcolor=#FFC2E0
| 378358 ||  || — || June 7, 2007 || Socorro || LINEAR || APOPHAcritical || align=right data-sort-value="0.49" | 490 m || 
|-id=359 bgcolor=#fefefe
| 378359 ||  || — || June 8, 2007 || Kitt Peak || Spacewatch || H || align=right data-sort-value="0.59" | 590 m || 
|-id=360 bgcolor=#E9E9E9
| 378360 ||  || — || June 8, 2007 || Kitt Peak || Spacewatch || — || align=right | 1.1 km || 
|-id=361 bgcolor=#fefefe
| 378361 ||  || — || September 30, 2005 || Catalina || CSS || H || align=right data-sort-value="0.55" | 550 m || 
|-id=362 bgcolor=#E9E9E9
| 378362 ||  || — || June 10, 2007 || Kitt Peak || Spacewatch || — || align=right | 2.3 km || 
|-id=363 bgcolor=#E9E9E9
| 378363 ||  || — || June 10, 2007 || Kitt Peak || Spacewatch || — || align=right | 3.4 km || 
|-id=364 bgcolor=#E9E9E9
| 378364 ||  || — || June 14, 2007 || Kitt Peak || Spacewatch || — || align=right | 2.1 km || 
|-id=365 bgcolor=#d6d6d6
| 378365 ||  || — || June 14, 2007 || Kitt Peak || Spacewatch || — || align=right | 2.9 km || 
|-id=366 bgcolor=#E9E9E9
| 378366 ||  || — || June 16, 2007 || Kitt Peak || Spacewatch || — || align=right | 2.6 km || 
|-id=367 bgcolor=#E9E9E9
| 378367 ||  || — || June 17, 2007 || Kitt Peak || Spacewatch || EUN || align=right | 1.4 km || 
|-id=368 bgcolor=#d6d6d6
| 378368 ||  || — || November 19, 2003 || Anderson Mesa || LONEOS || — || align=right | 3.3 km || 
|-id=369 bgcolor=#d6d6d6
| 378369 ||  || — || June 20, 2007 || Kitt Peak || Spacewatch || — || align=right | 2.8 km || 
|-id=370 bgcolor=#d6d6d6
| 378370 Orton ||  ||  || July 24, 2007 || Wrightwood || J. W. Young || — || align=right | 3.4 km || 
|-id=371 bgcolor=#d6d6d6
| 378371 ||  || — || August 8, 2007 || Socorro || LINEAR || — || align=right | 3.8 km || 
|-id=372 bgcolor=#d6d6d6
| 378372 ||  || — || August 8, 2007 || Socorro || LINEAR || — || align=right | 3.2 km || 
|-id=373 bgcolor=#d6d6d6
| 378373 ||  || — || August 8, 2007 || Socorro || LINEAR || — || align=right | 3.5 km || 
|-id=374 bgcolor=#d6d6d6
| 378374 ||  || — || June 9, 2007 || Catalina || CSS || THB || align=right | 5.1 km || 
|-id=375 bgcolor=#d6d6d6
| 378375 ||  || — || August 12, 2007 || Socorro || LINEAR || — || align=right | 4.0 km || 
|-id=376 bgcolor=#d6d6d6
| 378376 ||  || — || August 13, 2007 || Socorro || LINEAR || TIR || align=right | 3.6 km || 
|-id=377 bgcolor=#d6d6d6
| 378377 ||  || — || August 8, 2007 || Socorro || LINEAR || EUP || align=right | 5.0 km || 
|-id=378 bgcolor=#d6d6d6
| 378378 ||  || — || August 13, 2007 || Socorro || LINEAR || — || align=right | 3.1 km || 
|-id=379 bgcolor=#d6d6d6
| 378379 ||  || — || August 16, 2007 || Socorro || LINEAR || EUP || align=right | 3.9 km || 
|-id=380 bgcolor=#d6d6d6
| 378380 ||  || — || August 23, 2007 || Kitt Peak || Spacewatch || — || align=right | 3.6 km || 
|-id=381 bgcolor=#d6d6d6
| 378381 ||  || — || August 21, 2007 || Siding Spring || SSS || TIR || align=right | 3.8 km || 
|-id=382 bgcolor=#d6d6d6
| 378382 ||  || — || August 24, 2007 || Kitt Peak || Spacewatch || — || align=right | 3.0 km || 
|-id=383 bgcolor=#d6d6d6
| 378383 ||  || — || August 23, 2007 || Kitt Peak || Spacewatch || THM || align=right | 2.2 km || 
|-id=384 bgcolor=#d6d6d6
| 378384 ||  || — || August 24, 2007 || Kitt Peak || Spacewatch || THB || align=right | 2.9 km || 
|-id=385 bgcolor=#d6d6d6
| 378385 ||  || — || August 24, 2007 || Kitt Peak || Spacewatch || — || align=right | 2.9 km || 
|-id=386 bgcolor=#d6d6d6
| 378386 ||  || — || August 23, 2007 || Kitt Peak || Spacewatch || — || align=right | 3.1 km || 
|-id=387 bgcolor=#d6d6d6
| 378387 ||  || — || August 21, 2007 || Anderson Mesa || LONEOS || EUP || align=right | 4.3 km || 
|-id=388 bgcolor=#d6d6d6
| 378388 ||  || — || August 24, 2007 || Kitt Peak || Spacewatch || CRO || align=right | 4.2 km || 
|-id=389 bgcolor=#d6d6d6
| 378389 ||  || — || September 3, 2007 || Catalina || CSS || — || align=right | 2.3 km || 
|-id=390 bgcolor=#d6d6d6
| 378390 ||  || — || March 8, 2005 || Catalina || CSS || — || align=right | 4.2 km || 
|-id=391 bgcolor=#d6d6d6
| 378391 ||  || — || September 4, 2007 || Mount Lemmon || Mount Lemmon Survey || — || align=right | 3.2 km || 
|-id=392 bgcolor=#d6d6d6
| 378392 ||  || — || September 4, 2007 || Catalina || CSS || ALA || align=right | 2.8 km || 
|-id=393 bgcolor=#d6d6d6
| 378393 ||  || — || September 5, 2007 || Catalina || CSS || TIR || align=right | 3.5 km || 
|-id=394 bgcolor=#d6d6d6
| 378394 ||  || — || September 9, 2007 || Kitt Peak || Spacewatch || — || align=right | 3.4 km || 
|-id=395 bgcolor=#d6d6d6
| 378395 ||  || — || September 9, 2007 || Kitt Peak || Spacewatch || — || align=right | 2.5 km || 
|-id=396 bgcolor=#d6d6d6
| 378396 ||  || — || September 9, 2007 || Kitt Peak || Spacewatch || — || align=right | 3.8 km || 
|-id=397 bgcolor=#d6d6d6
| 378397 ||  || — || September 9, 2007 || Mount Lemmon || Mount Lemmon Survey || HYG || align=right | 4.6 km || 
|-id=398 bgcolor=#d6d6d6
| 378398 ||  || — || September 9, 2007 || Kitt Peak || Spacewatch || HYG || align=right | 3.3 km || 
|-id=399 bgcolor=#d6d6d6
| 378399 ||  || — || September 9, 2007 || Kitt Peak || Spacewatch || — || align=right | 4.2 km || 
|-id=400 bgcolor=#d6d6d6
| 378400 ||  || — || September 10, 2007 || Kitt Peak || Spacewatch || — || align=right | 3.1 km || 
|}

378401–378500 

|-bgcolor=#d6d6d6
| 378401 ||  || — || September 10, 2007 || Kitt Peak || Spacewatch || — || align=right | 2.7 km || 
|-id=402 bgcolor=#d6d6d6
| 378402 ||  || — || September 3, 2007 || Catalina || CSS || — || align=right | 3.6 km || 
|-id=403 bgcolor=#d6d6d6
| 378403 ||  || — || August 10, 2007 || Kitt Peak || Spacewatch || — || align=right | 3.0 km || 
|-id=404 bgcolor=#d6d6d6
| 378404 ||  || — || September 10, 2007 || Mount Lemmon || Mount Lemmon Survey || THM || align=right | 2.3 km || 
|-id=405 bgcolor=#d6d6d6
| 378405 ||  || — || September 10, 2007 || Mount Lemmon || Mount Lemmon Survey || VER || align=right | 3.2 km || 
|-id=406 bgcolor=#d6d6d6
| 378406 ||  || — || September 10, 2007 || Kitt Peak || Spacewatch || — || align=right | 4.9 km || 
|-id=407 bgcolor=#d6d6d6
| 378407 ||  || — || September 10, 2007 || Kitt Peak || Spacewatch || — || align=right | 4.1 km || 
|-id=408 bgcolor=#d6d6d6
| 378408 ||  || — || September 11, 2007 || Kitt Peak || Spacewatch || — || align=right | 2.7 km || 
|-id=409 bgcolor=#d6d6d6
| 378409 ||  || — || September 11, 2007 || Kitt Peak || Spacewatch || URS || align=right | 3.4 km || 
|-id=410 bgcolor=#d6d6d6
| 378410 ||  || — || September 11, 2007 || Mount Lemmon || Mount Lemmon Survey || — || align=right | 3.6 km || 
|-id=411 bgcolor=#d6d6d6
| 378411 ||  || — || September 11, 2007 || XuYi || PMO NEO || EOS || align=right | 2.3 km || 
|-id=412 bgcolor=#d6d6d6
| 378412 ||  || — || September 12, 2007 || Mount Lemmon || Mount Lemmon Survey || THM || align=right | 2.1 km || 
|-id=413 bgcolor=#d6d6d6
| 378413 ||  || — || September 12, 2007 || Mount Lemmon || Mount Lemmon Survey || — || align=right | 2.4 km || 
|-id=414 bgcolor=#fefefe
| 378414 ||  || — || September 12, 2007 || Mount Lemmon || Mount Lemmon Survey || — || align=right data-sort-value="0.89" | 890 m || 
|-id=415 bgcolor=#d6d6d6
| 378415 ||  || — || September 12, 2007 || Mount Lemmon || Mount Lemmon Survey || — || align=right | 2.9 km || 
|-id=416 bgcolor=#fefefe
| 378416 ||  || — || September 14, 2007 || Socorro || LINEAR || — || align=right data-sort-value="0.91" | 910 m || 
|-id=417 bgcolor=#d6d6d6
| 378417 ||  || — || September 10, 2007 || Kitt Peak || Spacewatch || — || align=right | 2.7 km || 
|-id=418 bgcolor=#d6d6d6
| 378418 ||  || — || September 10, 2007 || Kitt Peak || Spacewatch || — || align=right | 4.7 km || 
|-id=419 bgcolor=#d6d6d6
| 378419 ||  || — || September 5, 2007 || Anderson Mesa || LONEOS || — || align=right | 3.9 km || 
|-id=420 bgcolor=#d6d6d6
| 378420 ||  || — || February 29, 2004 || Kitt Peak || Spacewatch || — || align=right | 3.0 km || 
|-id=421 bgcolor=#d6d6d6
| 378421 ||  || — || September 10, 2007 || Mount Lemmon || Mount Lemmon Survey || — || align=right | 3.1 km || 
|-id=422 bgcolor=#d6d6d6
| 378422 ||  || — || September 10, 2007 || Kitt Peak || Spacewatch || — || align=right | 3.0 km || 
|-id=423 bgcolor=#d6d6d6
| 378423 ||  || — || September 10, 2007 || Kitt Peak || Spacewatch || EUP || align=right | 5.4 km || 
|-id=424 bgcolor=#d6d6d6
| 378424 ||  || — || September 11, 2007 || Kitt Peak || Spacewatch || — || align=right | 2.6 km || 
|-id=425 bgcolor=#d6d6d6
| 378425 ||  || — || September 14, 2007 || Mount Lemmon || Mount Lemmon Survey || HYG || align=right | 3.0 km || 
|-id=426 bgcolor=#d6d6d6
| 378426 ||  || — || September 14, 2007 || Mount Lemmon || Mount Lemmon Survey || — || align=right | 2.9 km || 
|-id=427 bgcolor=#d6d6d6
| 378427 ||  || — || September 14, 2007 || Siding Spring || SSS || TIR || align=right | 3.6 km || 
|-id=428 bgcolor=#d6d6d6
| 378428 ||  || — || September 10, 2007 || Kitt Peak || Spacewatch || HYG || align=right | 2.5 km || 
|-id=429 bgcolor=#d6d6d6
| 378429 ||  || — || September 10, 2007 || Kitt Peak || Spacewatch || — || align=right | 3.6 km || 
|-id=430 bgcolor=#d6d6d6
| 378430 ||  || — || September 11, 2007 || Kitt Peak || Spacewatch || — || align=right | 2.9 km || 
|-id=431 bgcolor=#d6d6d6
| 378431 ||  || — || September 11, 2007 || XuYi || PMO NEO || — || align=right | 3.6 km || 
|-id=432 bgcolor=#d6d6d6
| 378432 ||  || — || September 14, 2007 || Anderson Mesa || LONEOS || EOS || align=right | 2.6 km || 
|-id=433 bgcolor=#d6d6d6
| 378433 ||  || — || September 12, 2007 || Catalina || CSS || — || align=right | 3.6 km || 
|-id=434 bgcolor=#d6d6d6
| 378434 ||  || — || September 13, 2007 || Catalina || CSS || — || align=right | 4.1 km || 
|-id=435 bgcolor=#d6d6d6
| 378435 ||  || — || September 13, 2007 || Kitt Peak || Spacewatch || EOS || align=right | 2.3 km || 
|-id=436 bgcolor=#d6d6d6
| 378436 ||  || — || September 15, 2007 || Kitt Peak || Spacewatch || THM || align=right | 2.1 km || 
|-id=437 bgcolor=#d6d6d6
| 378437 ||  || — || September 15, 2007 || Kitt Peak || Spacewatch || HYG || align=right | 2.6 km || 
|-id=438 bgcolor=#d6d6d6
| 378438 ||  || — || September 15, 2007 || Kitt Peak || Spacewatch || — || align=right | 3.1 km || 
|-id=439 bgcolor=#d6d6d6
| 378439 ||  || — || September 13, 2007 || Mount Lemmon || Mount Lemmon Survey || — || align=right | 2.9 km || 
|-id=440 bgcolor=#d6d6d6
| 378440 ||  || — || September 12, 2007 || Mount Lemmon || Mount Lemmon Survey || — || align=right | 3.1 km || 
|-id=441 bgcolor=#d6d6d6
| 378441 ||  || — || September 12, 2007 || Mount Lemmon || Mount Lemmon Survey || HYG || align=right | 2.9 km || 
|-id=442 bgcolor=#d6d6d6
| 378442 ||  || — || September 13, 2007 || Mount Lemmon || Mount Lemmon Survey || THM || align=right | 2.5 km || 
|-id=443 bgcolor=#d6d6d6
| 378443 ||  || — || September 13, 2007 || Mount Lemmon || Mount Lemmon Survey || URS || align=right | 3.4 km || 
|-id=444 bgcolor=#d6d6d6
| 378444 ||  || — || September 15, 2007 || Kitt Peak || Spacewatch || — || align=right | 2.8 km || 
|-id=445 bgcolor=#d6d6d6
| 378445 ||  || — || September 12, 2007 || Mount Lemmon || Mount Lemmon Survey || HYG || align=right | 3.2 km || 
|-id=446 bgcolor=#d6d6d6
| 378446 ||  || — || September 12, 2007 || Mount Lemmon || Mount Lemmon Survey || — || align=right | 3.3 km || 
|-id=447 bgcolor=#d6d6d6
| 378447 ||  || — || September 12, 2007 || Catalina || CSS || — || align=right | 3.6 km || 
|-id=448 bgcolor=#d6d6d6
| 378448 ||  || — || September 3, 2007 || Catalina || CSS || HYG || align=right | 2.8 km || 
|-id=449 bgcolor=#d6d6d6
| 378449 ||  || — || September 13, 2007 || Mount Lemmon || Mount Lemmon Survey || — || align=right | 2.9 km || 
|-id=450 bgcolor=#d6d6d6
| 378450 ||  || — || September 14, 2007 || Catalina || CSS || — || align=right | 3.7 km || 
|-id=451 bgcolor=#d6d6d6
| 378451 ||  || — || September 3, 2007 || Catalina || CSS || — || align=right | 3.0 km || 
|-id=452 bgcolor=#d6d6d6
| 378452 ||  || — || September 3, 2007 || Mount Lemmon || Mount Lemmon Survey || — || align=right | 3.4 km || 
|-id=453 bgcolor=#d6d6d6
| 378453 ||  || — || January 13, 2004 || Anderson Mesa || LONEOS || — || align=right | 4.2 km || 
|-id=454 bgcolor=#d6d6d6
| 378454 ||  || — || February 13, 2004 || Kitt Peak || Spacewatch || — || align=right | 3.0 km || 
|-id=455 bgcolor=#d6d6d6
| 378455 ||  || — || September 10, 2007 || Kitt Peak || Spacewatch || — || align=right | 3.4 km || 
|-id=456 bgcolor=#d6d6d6
| 378456 ||  || — || September 11, 2007 || Kitt Peak || Spacewatch || — || align=right | 4.0 km || 
|-id=457 bgcolor=#d6d6d6
| 378457 ||  || — || September 12, 2007 || Catalina || CSS || — || align=right | 3.5 km || 
|-id=458 bgcolor=#d6d6d6
| 378458 || 2007 ST || — || September 18, 2007 || Hibiscus || S. F. Hönig, N. Teamo || THB || align=right | 3.6 km || 
|-id=459 bgcolor=#d6d6d6
| 378459 ||  || — || September 21, 2007 || Schiaparelli || Schiaparelli Obs. || — || align=right | 4.4 km || 
|-id=460 bgcolor=#d6d6d6
| 378460 ||  || — || September 18, 2007 || Socorro || LINEAR || — || align=right | 3.4 km || 
|-id=461 bgcolor=#d6d6d6
| 378461 ||  || — || September 11, 2007 || Catalina || CSS || MEL || align=right | 3.5 km || 
|-id=462 bgcolor=#d6d6d6
| 378462 ||  || — || October 6, 2007 || Dauban || Chante-Perdrix Obs. || VER || align=right | 3.7 km || 
|-id=463 bgcolor=#d6d6d6
| 378463 ||  || — || October 7, 2007 || Pla D'Arguines || R. Ferrando || HYG || align=right | 2.9 km || 
|-id=464 bgcolor=#d6d6d6
| 378464 ||  || — || October 3, 2007 || Eskridge || G. Hug || VER || align=right | 3.0 km || 
|-id=465 bgcolor=#d6d6d6
| 378465 ||  || — || October 6, 2007 || Socorro || LINEAR || HYG || align=right | 3.3 km || 
|-id=466 bgcolor=#d6d6d6
| 378466 ||  || — || October 7, 2007 || Socorro || LINEAR || — || align=right | 4.0 km || 
|-id=467 bgcolor=#d6d6d6
| 378467 ||  || — || October 11, 2007 || Eskridge || G. Hug || — || align=right | 2.1 km || 
|-id=468 bgcolor=#d6d6d6
| 378468 ||  || — || October 4, 2007 || Mount Lemmon || Mount Lemmon Survey || TIR || align=right | 3.8 km || 
|-id=469 bgcolor=#d6d6d6
| 378469 ||  || — || October 5, 2007 || Siding Spring || SSS || — || align=right | 4.0 km || 
|-id=470 bgcolor=#d6d6d6
| 378470 ||  || — || October 5, 2007 || Kitt Peak || Spacewatch || EUP || align=right | 3.6 km || 
|-id=471 bgcolor=#d6d6d6
| 378471 ||  || — || October 11, 2007 || Alter Satzberg Obs. || M. Pietschnig || — || align=right | 3.0 km || 
|-id=472 bgcolor=#d6d6d6
| 378472 ||  || — || October 5, 2007 || Kitt Peak || Spacewatch || — || align=right | 2.7 km || 
|-id=473 bgcolor=#d6d6d6
| 378473 ||  || — || October 8, 2007 || Mount Lemmon || Mount Lemmon Survey || — || align=right | 2.9 km || 
|-id=474 bgcolor=#d6d6d6
| 378474 ||  || — || October 8, 2007 || Mount Lemmon || Mount Lemmon Survey || — || align=right | 3.9 km || 
|-id=475 bgcolor=#d6d6d6
| 378475 ||  || — || October 4, 2007 || Mount Lemmon || Mount Lemmon Survey || — || align=right | 3.6 km || 
|-id=476 bgcolor=#d6d6d6
| 378476 ||  || — || July 27, 2001 || Anderson Mesa || LONEOS || — || align=right | 3.1 km || 
|-id=477 bgcolor=#d6d6d6
| 378477 ||  || — || October 8, 2007 || Anderson Mesa || LONEOS || — || align=right | 3.9 km || 
|-id=478 bgcolor=#d6d6d6
| 378478 ||  || — || October 9, 2007 || Kitt Peak || Spacewatch || — || align=right | 3.5 km || 
|-id=479 bgcolor=#d6d6d6
| 378479 ||  || — || October 6, 2007 || Kitt Peak || Spacewatch || VER || align=right | 3.0 km || 
|-id=480 bgcolor=#d6d6d6
| 378480 ||  || — || October 9, 2007 || Kitt Peak || Spacewatch || — || align=right | 3.0 km || 
|-id=481 bgcolor=#d6d6d6
| 378481 ||  || — || October 4, 2007 || XuYi || PMO NEO || TIR || align=right | 4.2 km || 
|-id=482 bgcolor=#d6d6d6
| 378482 ||  || — || September 18, 2007 || Catalina || CSS || — || align=right | 3.4 km || 
|-id=483 bgcolor=#d6d6d6
| 378483 ||  || — || October 9, 2007 || Socorro || LINEAR || HYG || align=right | 3.8 km || 
|-id=484 bgcolor=#d6d6d6
| 378484 ||  || — || September 12, 2007 || Mount Lemmon || Mount Lemmon Survey || EUP || align=right | 3.8 km || 
|-id=485 bgcolor=#d6d6d6
| 378485 ||  || — || October 9, 2007 || Socorro || LINEAR || — || align=right | 2.8 km || 
|-id=486 bgcolor=#d6d6d6
| 378486 ||  || — || October 12, 2007 || Socorro || LINEAR || HYG || align=right | 3.3 km || 
|-id=487 bgcolor=#d6d6d6
| 378487 ||  || — || October 4, 2007 || Kitt Peak || Spacewatch || HYG || align=right | 3.2 km || 
|-id=488 bgcolor=#d6d6d6
| 378488 ||  || — || October 8, 2007 || Catalina || CSS || — || align=right | 3.9 km || 
|-id=489 bgcolor=#d6d6d6
| 378489 ||  || — || October 8, 2007 || Catalina || CSS || URS || align=right | 3.0 km || 
|-id=490 bgcolor=#d6d6d6
| 378490 ||  || — || October 7, 2007 || Kitt Peak || Spacewatch || VER || align=right | 3.3 km || 
|-id=491 bgcolor=#d6d6d6
| 378491 ||  || — || October 9, 2007 || Kitt Peak || Spacewatch || — || align=right | 3.3 km || 
|-id=492 bgcolor=#d6d6d6
| 378492 ||  || — || October 9, 2007 || Kitt Peak || Spacewatch || ELF || align=right | 4.9 km || 
|-id=493 bgcolor=#d6d6d6
| 378493 ||  || — || October 10, 2007 || Mount Lemmon || Mount Lemmon Survey || — || align=right | 3.3 km || 
|-id=494 bgcolor=#d6d6d6
| 378494 ||  || — || October 11, 2007 || Mount Lemmon || Mount Lemmon Survey || — || align=right | 2.7 km || 
|-id=495 bgcolor=#d6d6d6
| 378495 ||  || — || September 12, 2007 || Catalina || CSS || — || align=right | 3.8 km || 
|-id=496 bgcolor=#d6d6d6
| 378496 ||  || — || September 15, 2007 || Kitt Peak || Spacewatch || HYG || align=right | 3.0 km || 
|-id=497 bgcolor=#d6d6d6
| 378497 ||  || — || October 12, 2007 || Kitt Peak || Spacewatch || — || align=right | 4.3 km || 
|-id=498 bgcolor=#d6d6d6
| 378498 ||  || — || October 11, 2007 || Catalina || CSS || — || align=right | 3.9 km || 
|-id=499 bgcolor=#d6d6d6
| 378499 ||  || — || October 11, 2007 || Mount Lemmon || Mount Lemmon Survey || — || align=right | 3.2 km || 
|-id=500 bgcolor=#d6d6d6
| 378500 ||  || — || October 13, 2007 || Catalina || CSS || THM || align=right | 2.4 km || 
|}

378501–378600 

|-bgcolor=#d6d6d6
| 378501 ||  || — || October 12, 2007 || Goodricke-Pigott || R. A. Tucker || — || align=right | 4.8 km || 
|-id=502 bgcolor=#E9E9E9
| 378502 ||  || — || October 15, 2007 || Kitt Peak || Spacewatch || — || align=right | 1.00 km || 
|-id=503 bgcolor=#d6d6d6
| 378503 ||  || — || October 11, 2007 || Catalina || CSS || — || align=right | 3.8 km || 
|-id=504 bgcolor=#d6d6d6
| 378504 ||  || — || October 4, 2007 || Kitt Peak || Spacewatch || — || align=right | 2.6 km || 
|-id=505 bgcolor=#d6d6d6
| 378505 ||  || — || October 12, 2007 || Catalina || CSS || — || align=right | 4.0 km || 
|-id=506 bgcolor=#d6d6d6
| 378506 ||  || — || October 9, 2007 || Mount Lemmon || Mount Lemmon Survey || HYG || align=right | 3.0 km || 
|-id=507 bgcolor=#d6d6d6
| 378507 ||  || — || October 3, 2007 || Las Campanas || Las Campanas Obs. || — || align=right | 5.5 km || 
|-id=508 bgcolor=#d6d6d6
| 378508 ||  || — || October 9, 2007 || Kitt Peak || Spacewatch || — || align=right | 4.3 km || 
|-id=509 bgcolor=#d6d6d6
| 378509 ||  || — || October 17, 2007 || Anderson Mesa || LONEOS || HYG || align=right | 4.9 km || 
|-id=510 bgcolor=#d6d6d6
| 378510 ||  || — || October 16, 2007 || Mount Lemmon || Mount Lemmon Survey || — || align=right | 3.2 km || 
|-id=511 bgcolor=#d6d6d6
| 378511 ||  || — || September 13, 2007 || Mount Lemmon || Mount Lemmon Survey || — || align=right | 2.9 km || 
|-id=512 bgcolor=#d6d6d6
| 378512 ||  || — || October 18, 2007 || Mount Lemmon || Mount Lemmon Survey || — || align=right | 2.6 km || 
|-id=513 bgcolor=#d6d6d6
| 378513 ||  || — || October 16, 2007 || Kitt Peak || Spacewatch || — || align=right | 3.9 km || 
|-id=514 bgcolor=#d6d6d6
| 378514 ||  || — || October 18, 2007 || Kitt Peak || Spacewatch || — || align=right | 3.3 km || 
|-id=515 bgcolor=#d6d6d6
| 378515 ||  || — || October 30, 2007 || Mount Lemmon || Mount Lemmon Survey || — || align=right | 5.3 km || 
|-id=516 bgcolor=#d6d6d6
| 378516 ||  || — || October 30, 2007 || Mount Lemmon || Mount Lemmon Survey || VER || align=right | 3.1 km || 
|-id=517 bgcolor=#fefefe
| 378517 ||  || — || October 16, 2007 || Mount Lemmon || Mount Lemmon Survey || — || align=right data-sort-value="0.73" | 730 m || 
|-id=518 bgcolor=#d6d6d6
| 378518 ||  || — || October 31, 2007 || Mount Lemmon || Mount Lemmon Survey || LUT || align=right | 5.9 km || 
|-id=519 bgcolor=#d6d6d6
| 378519 ||  || — || October 11, 2007 || Catalina || CSS || HYG || align=right | 3.3 km || 
|-id=520 bgcolor=#d6d6d6
| 378520 ||  || — || November 2, 2007 || Catalina || CSS || — || align=right | 4.0 km || 
|-id=521 bgcolor=#d6d6d6
| 378521 ||  || — || November 2, 2007 || Mount Lemmon || Mount Lemmon Survey || — || align=right | 2.9 km || 
|-id=522 bgcolor=#d6d6d6
| 378522 ||  || — || November 3, 2007 || Mount Lemmon || Mount Lemmon Survey || — || align=right | 3.1 km || 
|-id=523 bgcolor=#d6d6d6
| 378523 ||  || — || November 2, 2007 || Catalina || CSS || — || align=right | 4.4 km || 
|-id=524 bgcolor=#d6d6d6
| 378524 ||  || — || November 5, 2007 || Kitt Peak || Spacewatch || — || align=right | 4.2 km || 
|-id=525 bgcolor=#d6d6d6
| 378525 ||  || — || November 7, 2007 || Mount Lemmon || Mount Lemmon Survey || — || align=right | 2.9 km || 
|-id=526 bgcolor=#FFC2E0
| 378526 ||  || — || November 11, 2007 || Catalina || CSS || AMO || align=right data-sort-value="0.32" | 320 m || 
|-id=527 bgcolor=#d6d6d6
| 378527 ||  || — || November 13, 2007 || Mount Lemmon || Mount Lemmon Survey || SHU3:2 || align=right | 6.4 km || 
|-id=528 bgcolor=#fefefe
| 378528 ||  || — || November 21, 2007 || Mount Lemmon || Mount Lemmon Survey || — || align=right data-sort-value="0.68" | 680 m || 
|-id=529 bgcolor=#fefefe
| 378529 ||  || — || December 4, 2007 || Mount Lemmon || Mount Lemmon Survey || — || align=right data-sort-value="0.70" | 700 m || 
|-id=530 bgcolor=#fefefe
| 378530 ||  || — || December 28, 2007 || Kitt Peak || Spacewatch || — || align=right data-sort-value="0.82" | 820 m || 
|-id=531 bgcolor=#d6d6d6
| 378531 ||  || — || January 10, 2008 || Kitt Peak || Spacewatch || 3:2 || align=right | 4.9 km || 
|-id=532 bgcolor=#FA8072
| 378532 ||  || — || January 10, 2008 || Mount Lemmon || Mount Lemmon Survey || — || align=right | 1.4 km || 
|-id=533 bgcolor=#fefefe
| 378533 ||  || — || December 30, 2007 || Kitt Peak || Spacewatch || — || align=right data-sort-value="0.64" | 640 m || 
|-id=534 bgcolor=#d6d6d6
| 378534 ||  || — || January 14, 2008 || Kitt Peak || Spacewatch || HIL3:2 || align=right | 5.8 km || 
|-id=535 bgcolor=#fefefe
| 378535 ||  || — || January 14, 2008 || Kitt Peak || Spacewatch || — || align=right data-sort-value="0.80" | 800 m || 
|-id=536 bgcolor=#d6d6d6
| 378536 ||  || — || January 14, 2008 || Kitt Peak || Spacewatch || ALA || align=right | 4.6 km || 
|-id=537 bgcolor=#fefefe
| 378537 ||  || — || January 11, 2008 || Kitt Peak || Spacewatch || — || align=right data-sort-value="0.62" | 620 m || 
|-id=538 bgcolor=#fefefe
| 378538 ||  || — || January 14, 2008 || Kitt Peak || Spacewatch || FLO || align=right data-sort-value="0.68" | 680 m || 
|-id=539 bgcolor=#d6d6d6
| 378539 ||  || — || January 16, 2008 || Kitt Peak || Spacewatch || — || align=right | 3.7 km || 
|-id=540 bgcolor=#fefefe
| 378540 ||  || — || January 30, 2008 || Kitt Peak || Spacewatch || — || align=right | 1.2 km || 
|-id=541 bgcolor=#fefefe
| 378541 ||  || — || January 30, 2008 || Kitt Peak || Spacewatch || FLO || align=right data-sort-value="0.74" | 740 m || 
|-id=542 bgcolor=#fefefe
| 378542 ||  || — || December 31, 2007 || Kitt Peak || Spacewatch || — || align=right data-sort-value="0.69" | 690 m || 
|-id=543 bgcolor=#fefefe
| 378543 ||  || — || February 3, 2008 || Kitt Peak || Spacewatch || V || align=right data-sort-value="0.83" | 830 m || 
|-id=544 bgcolor=#fefefe
| 378544 ||  || — || February 1, 2008 || Kitt Peak || Spacewatch || — || align=right data-sort-value="0.73" | 730 m || 
|-id=545 bgcolor=#fefefe
| 378545 ||  || — || February 1, 2008 || Kitt Peak || Spacewatch || — || align=right data-sort-value="0.91" | 910 m || 
|-id=546 bgcolor=#fefefe
| 378546 ||  || — || February 2, 2008 || Kitt Peak || Spacewatch || — || align=right data-sort-value="0.92" | 920 m || 
|-id=547 bgcolor=#fefefe
| 378547 ||  || — || February 2, 2008 || Mount Lemmon || Mount Lemmon Survey || — || align=right data-sort-value="0.87" | 870 m || 
|-id=548 bgcolor=#fefefe
| 378548 ||  || — || January 11, 2008 || Mount Lemmon || Mount Lemmon Survey || FLO || align=right data-sort-value="0.59" | 590 m || 
|-id=549 bgcolor=#fefefe
| 378549 ||  || — || February 7, 2008 || Kitt Peak || Spacewatch || — || align=right data-sort-value="0.73" | 730 m || 
|-id=550 bgcolor=#d6d6d6
| 378550 ||  || — || February 9, 2008 || Kitt Peak || Spacewatch || 3:2 || align=right | 3.9 km || 
|-id=551 bgcolor=#fefefe
| 378551 ||  || — || February 9, 2008 || Catalina || CSS || — || align=right | 1.0 km || 
|-id=552 bgcolor=#fefefe
| 378552 ||  || — || January 20, 2008 || Kitt Peak || Spacewatch || FLO || align=right data-sort-value="0.72" | 720 m || 
|-id=553 bgcolor=#fefefe
| 378553 ||  || — || February 8, 2008 || Kitt Peak || Spacewatch || — || align=right data-sort-value="0.79" | 790 m || 
|-id=554 bgcolor=#fefefe
| 378554 ||  || — || January 11, 2008 || Mount Lemmon || Mount Lemmon Survey || — || align=right data-sort-value="0.81" | 810 m || 
|-id=555 bgcolor=#fefefe
| 378555 ||  || — || February 9, 2008 || Catalina || CSS || FLO || align=right data-sort-value="0.76" | 760 m || 
|-id=556 bgcolor=#fefefe
| 378556 ||  || — || February 9, 2008 || Kitt Peak || Spacewatch || — || align=right data-sort-value="0.90" | 900 m || 
|-id=557 bgcolor=#fefefe
| 378557 ||  || — || February 9, 2008 || Kitt Peak || Spacewatch || — || align=right data-sort-value="0.69" | 690 m || 
|-id=558 bgcolor=#fefefe
| 378558 ||  || — || February 10, 2008 || Catalina || CSS || — || align=right | 1.0 km || 
|-id=559 bgcolor=#fefefe
| 378559 ||  || — || February 12, 2008 || Mount Lemmon || Mount Lemmon Survey || — || align=right | 1.1 km || 
|-id=560 bgcolor=#fefefe
| 378560 ||  || — || February 13, 2008 || Mount Lemmon || Mount Lemmon Survey || — || align=right data-sort-value="0.98" | 980 m || 
|-id=561 bgcolor=#fefefe
| 378561 ||  || — || February 11, 2008 || Mount Lemmon || Mount Lemmon Survey || FLO || align=right data-sort-value="0.58" | 580 m || 
|-id=562 bgcolor=#fefefe
| 378562 ||  || — || February 14, 2008 || Mount Lemmon || Mount Lemmon Survey || FLO || align=right data-sort-value="0.63" | 630 m || 
|-id=563 bgcolor=#fefefe
| 378563 ||  || — || February 8, 2008 || Kitt Peak || Spacewatch || — || align=right data-sort-value="0.75" | 750 m || 
|-id=564 bgcolor=#fefefe
| 378564 ||  || — || February 8, 2008 || Kitt Peak || Spacewatch || — || align=right data-sort-value="0.58" | 580 m || 
|-id=565 bgcolor=#fefefe
| 378565 ||  || — || February 2, 2008 || Kitt Peak || Spacewatch || NYS || align=right data-sort-value="0.67" | 670 m || 
|-id=566 bgcolor=#d6d6d6
| 378566 ||  || — || February 2, 2008 || Mount Lemmon || Mount Lemmon Survey || 3:2 || align=right | 4.2 km || 
|-id=567 bgcolor=#fefefe
| 378567 ||  || — || February 2, 2008 || Kitt Peak || Spacewatch || NYS || align=right data-sort-value="0.79" | 790 m || 
|-id=568 bgcolor=#fefefe
| 378568 ||  || — || February 9, 2008 || Mount Lemmon || Mount Lemmon Survey || NYS || align=right data-sort-value="0.66" | 660 m || 
|-id=569 bgcolor=#fefefe
| 378569 ||  || — || February 12, 2008 || Socorro || LINEAR || — || align=right data-sort-value="0.93" | 930 m || 
|-id=570 bgcolor=#fefefe
| 378570 ||  || — || February 26, 2008 || Mount Lemmon || Mount Lemmon Survey || MAS || align=right data-sort-value="0.86" | 860 m || 
|-id=571 bgcolor=#fefefe
| 378571 ||  || — || February 27, 2008 || Kitt Peak || Spacewatch || NYS || align=right data-sort-value="0.76" | 760 m || 
|-id=572 bgcolor=#fefefe
| 378572 ||  || — || February 27, 2008 || Kitt Peak || Spacewatch || NYS || align=right data-sort-value="0.69" | 690 m || 
|-id=573 bgcolor=#fefefe
| 378573 ||  || — || February 29, 2008 || Mount Lemmon || Mount Lemmon Survey || — || align=right data-sort-value="0.79" | 790 m || 
|-id=574 bgcolor=#fefefe
| 378574 ||  || — || February 29, 2008 || Siding Spring || SSS || — || align=right | 1.1 km || 
|-id=575 bgcolor=#fefefe
| 378575 ||  || — || February 26, 2008 || Kitt Peak || Spacewatch || FLO || align=right data-sort-value="0.71" | 710 m || 
|-id=576 bgcolor=#fefefe
| 378576 ||  || — || February 28, 2008 || Kitt Peak || Spacewatch || NYS || align=right data-sort-value="0.79" | 790 m || 
|-id=577 bgcolor=#fefefe
| 378577 ||  || — || February 28, 2008 || Kitt Peak || Spacewatch || — || align=right data-sort-value="0.78" | 780 m || 
|-id=578 bgcolor=#d6d6d6
| 378578 ||  || — || February 28, 2008 || Nogales || Tenagra II Obs. || SHU3:2 || align=right | 5.8 km || 
|-id=579 bgcolor=#fefefe
| 378579 ||  || — || February 27, 2008 || Mount Lemmon || Mount Lemmon Survey || — || align=right data-sort-value="0.72" | 720 m || 
|-id=580 bgcolor=#fefefe
| 378580 ||  || — || January 28, 2004 || Kitt Peak || Spacewatch || — || align=right | 1.2 km || 
|-id=581 bgcolor=#fefefe
| 378581 ||  || — || February 29, 2008 || Kitt Peak || Spacewatch || — || align=right data-sort-value="0.85" | 850 m || 
|-id=582 bgcolor=#fefefe
| 378582 ||  || — || February 28, 2008 || Kitt Peak || Spacewatch || V || align=right data-sort-value="0.61" | 610 m || 
|-id=583 bgcolor=#fefefe
| 378583 ||  || — || February 25, 2008 || Mount Lemmon || Mount Lemmon Survey || — || align=right data-sort-value="0.88" | 880 m || 
|-id=584 bgcolor=#fefefe
| 378584 ||  || — || February 28, 2008 || Mount Lemmon || Mount Lemmon Survey || MAS || align=right data-sort-value="0.80" | 800 m || 
|-id=585 bgcolor=#fefefe
| 378585 ||  || — || March 3, 2008 || Dauban || F. Kugel || FLO || align=right data-sort-value="0.54" | 540 m || 
|-id=586 bgcolor=#fefefe
| 378586 ||  || — || March 1, 2008 || Kitt Peak || Spacewatch || V || align=right data-sort-value="0.75" | 750 m || 
|-id=587 bgcolor=#fefefe
| 378587 ||  || — || March 2, 2008 || Kitt Peak || Spacewatch || — || align=right data-sort-value="0.75" | 750 m || 
|-id=588 bgcolor=#fefefe
| 378588 ||  || — || March 2, 2008 || Kitt Peak || Spacewatch || — || align=right data-sort-value="0.91" | 910 m || 
|-id=589 bgcolor=#fefefe
| 378589 ||  || — || March 3, 2008 || Catalina || CSS || — || align=right data-sort-value="0.92" | 920 m || 
|-id=590 bgcolor=#fefefe
| 378590 ||  || — || March 3, 2008 || Catalina || CSS || NYS || align=right data-sort-value="0.77" | 770 m || 
|-id=591 bgcolor=#fefefe
| 378591 ||  || — || March 2, 2008 || Kitt Peak || Spacewatch || — || align=right | 1.0 km || 
|-id=592 bgcolor=#C2FFFF
| 378592 ||  || — || March 4, 2008 || Kitt Peak || Spacewatch || L5ENM || align=right | 13 km || 
|-id=593 bgcolor=#fefefe
| 378593 ||  || — || September 15, 2006 || Kitt Peak || Spacewatch || — || align=right data-sort-value="0.86" | 860 m || 
|-id=594 bgcolor=#fefefe
| 378594 ||  || — || March 5, 2008 || Mount Lemmon || Mount Lemmon Survey || — || align=right data-sort-value="0.90" | 900 m || 
|-id=595 bgcolor=#fefefe
| 378595 ||  || — || March 5, 2008 || Mount Lemmon || Mount Lemmon Survey || — || align=right data-sort-value="0.85" | 850 m || 
|-id=596 bgcolor=#fefefe
| 378596 ||  || — || March 5, 2008 || Kitt Peak || Spacewatch || V || align=right data-sort-value="0.79" | 790 m || 
|-id=597 bgcolor=#fefefe
| 378597 ||  || — || March 6, 2008 || Mount Lemmon || Mount Lemmon Survey || — || align=right | 1.2 km || 
|-id=598 bgcolor=#fefefe
| 378598 ||  || — || January 10, 2008 || Kitt Peak || Spacewatch || V || align=right data-sort-value="0.73" | 730 m || 
|-id=599 bgcolor=#fefefe
| 378599 ||  || — || March 7, 2008 || Socorro || LINEAR || FLO || align=right data-sort-value="0.88" | 880 m || 
|-id=600 bgcolor=#fefefe
| 378600 ||  || — || March 9, 2008 || Socorro || LINEAR || — || align=right | 1.3 km || 
|}

378601–378700 

|-bgcolor=#fefefe
| 378601 ||  || — || March 7, 2008 || Mount Lemmon || Mount Lemmon Survey || FLO || align=right data-sort-value="0.64" | 640 m || 
|-id=602 bgcolor=#fefefe
| 378602 ||  || — || March 8, 2008 || Kitt Peak || Spacewatch || MAS || align=right data-sort-value="0.86" | 860 m || 
|-id=603 bgcolor=#fefefe
| 378603 ||  || — || March 9, 2008 || Kitt Peak || Spacewatch || — || align=right | 1.0 km || 
|-id=604 bgcolor=#fefefe
| 378604 ||  || — || March 11, 2008 || Kitt Peak || Spacewatch || — || align=right data-sort-value="0.92" | 920 m || 
|-id=605 bgcolor=#fefefe
| 378605 ||  || — || March 3, 2008 || Purple Mountain || PMO NEO || V || align=right data-sort-value="0.92" | 920 m || 
|-id=606 bgcolor=#fefefe
| 378606 ||  || — || March 4, 2008 || Mount Lemmon || Mount Lemmon Survey || — || align=right data-sort-value="0.91" | 910 m || 
|-id=607 bgcolor=#fefefe
| 378607 ||  || — || March 10, 2008 || Kitt Peak || Spacewatch || — || align=right data-sort-value="0.59" | 590 m || 
|-id=608 bgcolor=#fefefe
| 378608 ||  || — || March 1, 2008 || Kitt Peak || Spacewatch || V || align=right data-sort-value="0.57" | 570 m || 
|-id=609 bgcolor=#fefefe
| 378609 ||  || — || March 1, 2008 || Kitt Peak || Spacewatch || V || align=right data-sort-value="0.82" | 820 m || 
|-id=610 bgcolor=#FFC2E0
| 378610 ||  || — || March 29, 2008 || Kitt Peak || Spacewatch || AMO +1kmslow || align=right | 1.2 km || 
|-id=611 bgcolor=#fefefe
| 378611 ||  || — || March 26, 2008 || Kitt Peak || Spacewatch || V || align=right data-sort-value="0.92" | 920 m || 
|-id=612 bgcolor=#fefefe
| 378612 ||  || — || March 28, 2008 || Kitt Peak || Spacewatch || — || align=right data-sort-value="0.71" | 710 m || 
|-id=613 bgcolor=#fefefe
| 378613 ||  || — || March 28, 2008 || Kitt Peak || Spacewatch || — || align=right data-sort-value="0.88" | 880 m || 
|-id=614 bgcolor=#fefefe
| 378614 ||  || — || March 28, 2008 || Mount Lemmon || Mount Lemmon Survey || CLA || align=right | 1.7 km || 
|-id=615 bgcolor=#fefefe
| 378615 ||  || — || March 28, 2008 || Mount Lemmon || Mount Lemmon Survey || — || align=right data-sort-value="0.86" | 860 m || 
|-id=616 bgcolor=#fefefe
| 378616 ||  || — || March 28, 2008 || Mount Lemmon || Mount Lemmon Survey || V || align=right data-sort-value="0.67" | 670 m || 
|-id=617 bgcolor=#C2FFFF
| 378617 ||  || — || March 28, 2008 || Kitt Peak || Spacewatch || L5 || align=right | 14 km || 
|-id=618 bgcolor=#fefefe
| 378618 ||  || — || March 28, 2008 || Kitt Peak || Spacewatch || — || align=right | 1.1 km || 
|-id=619 bgcolor=#fefefe
| 378619 ||  || — || March 28, 2008 || Kitt Peak || Spacewatch || — || align=right data-sort-value="0.68" | 680 m || 
|-id=620 bgcolor=#C2FFFF
| 378620 ||  || — || March 28, 2008 || Kitt Peak || Spacewatch || L5010 || align=right | 11 km || 
|-id=621 bgcolor=#fefefe
| 378621 ||  || — || March 28, 2008 || Mount Lemmon || Mount Lemmon Survey || — || align=right data-sort-value="0.98" | 980 m || 
|-id=622 bgcolor=#fefefe
| 378622 ||  || — || March 28, 2008 || Mount Lemmon || Mount Lemmon Survey || — || align=right data-sort-value="0.70" | 700 m || 
|-id=623 bgcolor=#fefefe
| 378623 ||  || — || March 31, 2008 || Mount Lemmon || Mount Lemmon Survey || — || align=right data-sort-value="0.92" | 920 m || 
|-id=624 bgcolor=#fefefe
| 378624 ||  || — || March 27, 2008 || Kitt Peak || Spacewatch || — || align=right data-sort-value="0.68" | 680 m || 
|-id=625 bgcolor=#fefefe
| 378625 ||  || — || March 28, 2008 || Kitt Peak || Spacewatch || V || align=right data-sort-value="0.70" | 700 m || 
|-id=626 bgcolor=#fefefe
| 378626 ||  || — || March 29, 2008 || Mount Lemmon || Mount Lemmon Survey || NYS || align=right data-sort-value="0.70" | 700 m || 
|-id=627 bgcolor=#fefefe
| 378627 ||  || — || March 30, 2008 || Kitt Peak || Spacewatch || NYS || align=right data-sort-value="0.74" | 740 m || 
|-id=628 bgcolor=#fefefe
| 378628 ||  || — || March 30, 2008 || Kitt Peak || Spacewatch || ERI || align=right | 1.6 km || 
|-id=629 bgcolor=#fefefe
| 378629 ||  || — || March 30, 2008 || Kitt Peak || Spacewatch || V || align=right data-sort-value="0.71" | 710 m || 
|-id=630 bgcolor=#fefefe
| 378630 ||  || — || March 30, 2008 || Kitt Peak || Spacewatch || V || align=right data-sort-value="0.78" | 780 m || 
|-id=631 bgcolor=#fefefe
| 378631 ||  || — || March 31, 2008 || Kitt Peak || Spacewatch || — || align=right data-sort-value="0.86" | 860 m || 
|-id=632 bgcolor=#fefefe
| 378632 ||  || — || March 31, 2008 || Kitt Peak || Spacewatch || — || align=right data-sort-value="0.68" | 680 m || 
|-id=633 bgcolor=#fefefe
| 378633 ||  || — || March 31, 2008 || Mount Lemmon || Mount Lemmon Survey || V || align=right data-sort-value="0.69" | 690 m || 
|-id=634 bgcolor=#fefefe
| 378634 ||  || — || March 31, 2008 || Kitt Peak || Spacewatch || — || align=right data-sort-value="0.97" | 970 m || 
|-id=635 bgcolor=#fefefe
| 378635 ||  || — || March 26, 2008 || Mount Lemmon || Mount Lemmon Survey || — || align=right data-sort-value="0.71" | 710 m || 
|-id=636 bgcolor=#fefefe
| 378636 ||  || — || March 28, 2008 || Mount Lemmon || Mount Lemmon Survey || — || align=right data-sort-value="0.97" | 970 m || 
|-id=637 bgcolor=#fefefe
| 378637 ||  || — || March 31, 2008 || Kitt Peak || Spacewatch || V || align=right data-sort-value="0.75" | 750 m || 
|-id=638 bgcolor=#E9E9E9
| 378638 ||  || — || March 31, 2008 || Kitt Peak || Spacewatch || — || align=right | 1.0 km || 
|-id=639 bgcolor=#fefefe
| 378639 ||  || — || March 29, 2008 || Kitt Peak || Spacewatch || — || align=right data-sort-value="0.63" | 630 m || 
|-id=640 bgcolor=#C2FFFF
| 378640 ||  || — || March 30, 2008 || Kitt Peak || Spacewatch || L5 || align=right | 9.3 km || 
|-id=641 bgcolor=#C2FFFF
| 378641 ||  || — || March 30, 2008 || Kitt Peak || Spacewatch || L5 || align=right | 9.0 km || 
|-id=642 bgcolor=#fefefe
| 378642 ||  || — || March 29, 2008 || Kitt Peak || Spacewatch || — || align=right data-sort-value="0.83" | 830 m || 
|-id=643 bgcolor=#fefefe
| 378643 ||  || — || March 31, 2008 || Kitt Peak || Spacewatch || — || align=right | 1.1 km || 
|-id=644 bgcolor=#fefefe
| 378644 ||  || — || April 7, 2008 || Grove Creek || F. Tozzi || PHO || align=right | 1.2 km || 
|-id=645 bgcolor=#fefefe
| 378645 ||  || — || February 23, 2004 || Socorro || LINEAR || MAS || align=right data-sort-value="0.84" | 840 m || 
|-id=646 bgcolor=#fefefe
| 378646 ||  || — || April 3, 2008 || Mount Lemmon || Mount Lemmon Survey || FLO || align=right data-sort-value="0.62" | 620 m || 
|-id=647 bgcolor=#fefefe
| 378647 ||  || — || April 3, 2008 || Kitt Peak || Spacewatch || — || align=right | 1.4 km || 
|-id=648 bgcolor=#C2FFFF
| 378648 ||  || — || April 3, 2008 || Kitt Peak || Spacewatch || L5 || align=right | 8.3 km || 
|-id=649 bgcolor=#fefefe
| 378649 ||  || — || April 3, 2008 || Kitt Peak || Spacewatch || — || align=right data-sort-value="0.81" | 810 m || 
|-id=650 bgcolor=#fefefe
| 378650 ||  || — || April 3, 2008 || Kitt Peak || Spacewatch || — || align=right data-sort-value="0.96" | 960 m || 
|-id=651 bgcolor=#fefefe
| 378651 ||  || — || November 28, 1999 || Kitt Peak || Spacewatch || V || align=right data-sort-value="0.53" | 530 m || 
|-id=652 bgcolor=#C2FFFF
| 378652 ||  || — || September 19, 2001 || Kitt Peak || Spacewatch || L5 || align=right | 7.9 km || 
|-id=653 bgcolor=#E9E9E9
| 378653 ||  || — || April 4, 2008 || Kitt Peak || Spacewatch || — || align=right | 1.4 km || 
|-id=654 bgcolor=#C2FFFF
| 378654 ||  || — || April 5, 2008 || Mount Lemmon || Mount Lemmon Survey || L5 || align=right | 10 km || 
|-id=655 bgcolor=#fefefe
| 378655 ||  || — || April 7, 2008 || Mount Lemmon || Mount Lemmon Survey || — || align=right data-sort-value="0.72" | 720 m || 
|-id=656 bgcolor=#fefefe
| 378656 ||  || — || April 7, 2008 || Mount Lemmon || Mount Lemmon Survey || V || align=right data-sort-value="0.65" | 650 m || 
|-id=657 bgcolor=#fefefe
| 378657 ||  || — || April 7, 2008 || Kitt Peak || Spacewatch || V || align=right data-sort-value="0.69" | 690 m || 
|-id=658 bgcolor=#fefefe
| 378658 ||  || — || April 8, 2008 || Kitt Peak || Spacewatch || — || align=right data-sort-value="0.99" | 990 m || 
|-id=659 bgcolor=#fefefe
| 378659 ||  || — || April 8, 2008 || Kitt Peak || Spacewatch || NYS || align=right data-sort-value="0.73" | 730 m || 
|-id=660 bgcolor=#fefefe
| 378660 ||  || — || April 1, 2008 || Kitt Peak || Spacewatch || — || align=right data-sort-value="0.76" | 760 m || 
|-id=661 bgcolor=#fefefe
| 378661 ||  || — || March 28, 2008 || Kitt Peak || Spacewatch || — || align=right data-sort-value="0.94" | 940 m || 
|-id=662 bgcolor=#fefefe
| 378662 ||  || — || April 11, 2008 || Kitt Peak || Spacewatch || V || align=right data-sort-value="0.66" | 660 m || 
|-id=663 bgcolor=#fefefe
| 378663 ||  || — || April 12, 2008 || Catalina || CSS || FLO || align=right data-sort-value="0.87" | 870 m || 
|-id=664 bgcolor=#fefefe
| 378664 ||  || — || April 12, 2008 || Mount Lemmon || Mount Lemmon Survey || — || align=right data-sort-value="0.87" | 870 m || 
|-id=665 bgcolor=#C2FFFF
| 378665 ||  || — || April 11, 2008 || Kitt Peak || Spacewatch || L5 || align=right | 9.0 km || 
|-id=666 bgcolor=#fefefe
| 378666 ||  || — || April 11, 2008 || Kitt Peak || Spacewatch || — || align=right data-sort-value="0.91" | 910 m || 
|-id=667 bgcolor=#fefefe
| 378667 ||  || — || April 6, 2008 || Mount Lemmon || Mount Lemmon Survey || — || align=right data-sort-value="0.96" | 960 m || 
|-id=668 bgcolor=#C2FFFF
| 378668 ||  || — || April 7, 2008 || Kitt Peak || Spacewatch || L5 || align=right | 7.7 km || 
|-id=669 bgcolor=#fefefe
| 378669 Rivas ||  ||  || April 29, 2008 || Vicques || M. Ory || — || align=right data-sort-value="0.87" | 870 m || 
|-id=670 bgcolor=#fefefe
| 378670 ||  || — || April 24, 2008 || Kitt Peak || Spacewatch || LCI || align=right | 1.0 km || 
|-id=671 bgcolor=#fefefe
| 378671 ||  || — || April 24, 2008 || Kitt Peak || Spacewatch || LCI || align=right data-sort-value="0.81" | 810 m || 
|-id=672 bgcolor=#C2FFFF
| 378672 ||  || — || April 25, 2008 || Kitt Peak || Spacewatch || L5 || align=right | 9.5 km || 
|-id=673 bgcolor=#E9E9E9
| 378673 ||  || — || April 14, 2008 || Mount Lemmon || Mount Lemmon Survey || — || align=right data-sort-value="0.92" | 920 m || 
|-id=674 bgcolor=#fefefe
| 378674 ||  || — || April 26, 2008 || Mount Lemmon || Mount Lemmon Survey || MAS || align=right data-sort-value="0.85" | 850 m || 
|-id=675 bgcolor=#fefefe
| 378675 ||  || — || April 26, 2008 || Mount Lemmon || Mount Lemmon Survey || NYS || align=right data-sort-value="0.66" | 660 m || 
|-id=676 bgcolor=#fefefe
| 378676 ||  || — || April 26, 2008 || Mount Lemmon || Mount Lemmon Survey || V || align=right data-sort-value="0.72" | 720 m || 
|-id=677 bgcolor=#E9E9E9
| 378677 ||  || — || April 28, 2008 || Kitt Peak || Spacewatch || — || align=right data-sort-value="0.87" | 870 m || 
|-id=678 bgcolor=#fefefe
| 378678 ||  || — || April 29, 2008 || Kitt Peak || Spacewatch || V || align=right data-sort-value="0.61" | 610 m || 
|-id=679 bgcolor=#E9E9E9
| 378679 ||  || — || April 29, 2008 || Kitt Peak || Spacewatch || — || align=right data-sort-value="0.87" | 870 m || 
|-id=680 bgcolor=#C2FFFF
| 378680 ||  || — || April 28, 2008 || Kitt Peak || Spacewatch || L5 || align=right | 11 km || 
|-id=681 bgcolor=#C2FFFF
| 378681 ||  || — || April 29, 2008 || Mount Lemmon || Mount Lemmon Survey || L5 || align=right | 8.5 km || 
|-id=682 bgcolor=#E9E9E9
| 378682 ||  || — || May 1, 2008 || Kitt Peak || Spacewatch || — || align=right | 1.3 km || 
|-id=683 bgcolor=#E9E9E9
| 378683 ||  || — || May 3, 2008 || Kitt Peak || Spacewatch || — || align=right | 1.4 km || 
|-id=684 bgcolor=#fefefe
| 378684 ||  || — || May 3, 2008 || Mount Lemmon || Mount Lemmon Survey || — || align=right data-sort-value="0.75" | 750 m || 
|-id=685 bgcolor=#E9E9E9
| 378685 ||  || — || May 1, 2008 || Siding Spring || SSS || — || align=right | 1.9 km || 
|-id=686 bgcolor=#C2FFFF
| 378686 ||  || — || May 7, 2008 || Kitt Peak || Spacewatch || L5 || align=right | 10 km || 
|-id=687 bgcolor=#fefefe
| 378687 ||  || — || May 11, 2008 || Kitt Peak || Spacewatch || — || align=right data-sort-value="0.97" | 970 m || 
|-id=688 bgcolor=#E9E9E9
| 378688 ||  || — || May 15, 2008 || Mount Lemmon || Mount Lemmon Survey || — || align=right | 1.4 km || 
|-id=689 bgcolor=#fefefe
| 378689 ||  || — || May 27, 2008 || Kitt Peak || Spacewatch || — || align=right | 1.0 km || 
|-id=690 bgcolor=#fefefe
| 378690 ||  || — || March 15, 2004 || Kitt Peak || Spacewatch || — || align=right data-sort-value="0.69" | 690 m || 
|-id=691 bgcolor=#C2FFFF
| 378691 ||  || — || May 27, 2008 || Kitt Peak || Spacewatch || L5 || align=right | 10 km || 
|-id=692 bgcolor=#fefefe
| 378692 ||  || — || March 30, 2008 || Kitt Peak || Spacewatch || — || align=right data-sort-value="0.84" | 840 m || 
|-id=693 bgcolor=#fefefe
| 378693 ||  || — || May 27, 2008 || Mount Lemmon || Mount Lemmon Survey || — || align=right data-sort-value="0.84" | 840 m || 
|-id=694 bgcolor=#C2FFFF
| 378694 ||  || — || May 31, 2008 || Kitt Peak || Spacewatch || L5 || align=right | 11 km || 
|-id=695 bgcolor=#E9E9E9
| 378695 ||  || — || April 27, 2008 || Mount Lemmon || Mount Lemmon Survey || EUN || align=right | 1.3 km || 
|-id=696 bgcolor=#fefefe
| 378696 ||  || — || May 30, 2008 || Kitt Peak || Spacewatch || NYS || align=right data-sort-value="0.73" | 730 m || 
|-id=697 bgcolor=#fefefe
| 378697 ||  || — || June 1, 2008 || Mount Lemmon || Mount Lemmon Survey || — || align=right data-sort-value="0.98" | 980 m || 
|-id=698 bgcolor=#fefefe
| 378698 ||  || — || May 3, 2008 || Mount Lemmon || Mount Lemmon Survey || V || align=right data-sort-value="0.74" | 740 m || 
|-id=699 bgcolor=#E9E9E9
| 378699 ||  || — || June 10, 2008 || Kitt Peak || Spacewatch || — || align=right | 1.3 km || 
|-id=700 bgcolor=#E9E9E9
| 378700 ||  || — || June 26, 2008 || Siding Spring || SSS || — || align=right | 1.7 km || 
|}

378701–378800 

|-bgcolor=#FA8072
| 378701 ||  || — || July 1, 2008 || Bergisch Gladbac || W. Bickel || — || align=right data-sort-value="0.72" | 720 m || 
|-id=702 bgcolor=#E9E9E9
| 378702 ||  || — || July 25, 2008 || Siding Spring || SSS || CLO || align=right | 2.6 km || 
|-id=703 bgcolor=#E9E9E9
| 378703 ||  || — || July 29, 2008 || Kitt Peak || Spacewatch || MRX || align=right | 1.0 km || 
|-id=704 bgcolor=#E9E9E9
| 378704 ||  || — || July 29, 2008 || Kitt Peak || Spacewatch || WIT || align=right | 1.1 km || 
|-id=705 bgcolor=#E9E9E9
| 378705 ||  || — || July 29, 2008 || Kitt Peak || Spacewatch || — || align=right | 2.7 km || 
|-id=706 bgcolor=#E9E9E9
| 378706 ||  || — || July 30, 2008 || Kitt Peak || Spacewatch || — || align=right | 2.3 km || 
|-id=707 bgcolor=#E9E9E9
| 378707 ||  || — || August 2, 2008 || Siding Spring || SSS || — || align=right | 2.5 km || 
|-id=708 bgcolor=#E9E9E9
| 378708 ||  || — || August 10, 2008 || La Sagra || OAM Obs. || — || align=right | 1.7 km || 
|-id=709 bgcolor=#E9E9E9
| 378709 ||  || — || July 30, 2008 || Kitt Peak || Spacewatch || — || align=right | 3.3 km || 
|-id=710 bgcolor=#E9E9E9
| 378710 ||  || — || August 7, 2008 || La Sagra || OAM Obs. || — || align=right | 3.5 km || 
|-id=711 bgcolor=#d6d6d6
| 378711 ||  || — || July 26, 2008 || Siding Spring || SSS || BRA || align=right | 2.1 km || 
|-id=712 bgcolor=#E9E9E9
| 378712 ||  || — || August 2, 2008 || Siding Spring || SSS || — || align=right | 3.6 km || 
|-id=713 bgcolor=#E9E9E9
| 378713 ||  || — || August 5, 2008 || Siding Spring || SSS || — || align=right | 2.6 km || 
|-id=714 bgcolor=#d6d6d6
| 378714 ||  || — || August 2, 2008 || Siding Spring || SSS || — || align=right | 4.3 km || 
|-id=715 bgcolor=#E9E9E9
| 378715 ||  || — || August 6, 2008 || Siding Spring || SSS || — || align=right | 3.6 km || 
|-id=716 bgcolor=#E9E9E9
| 378716 ||  || — || August 23, 2008 || La Sagra || OAM Obs. || CLO || align=right | 3.3 km || 
|-id=717 bgcolor=#E9E9E9
| 378717 ||  || — || July 28, 2008 || Mount Lemmon || Mount Lemmon Survey || — || align=right | 2.7 km || 
|-id=718 bgcolor=#E9E9E9
| 378718 ||  || — || August 25, 2008 || La Sagra || OAM Obs. || GEF || align=right | 1.5 km || 
|-id=719 bgcolor=#E9E9E9
| 378719 ||  || — || August 21, 2008 || Kitt Peak || Spacewatch || — || align=right | 2.7 km || 
|-id=720 bgcolor=#E9E9E9
| 378720 ||  || — || August 22, 2008 || Kitt Peak || Spacewatch || — || align=right | 3.2 km || 
|-id=721 bgcolor=#E9E9E9
| 378721 Thizy ||  ||  || August 27, 2008 || Pises || J.-M. Lopez, C. Cavadore || HOF || align=right | 2.6 km || 
|-id=722 bgcolor=#E9E9E9
| 378722 ||  || — || August 27, 2008 || La Sagra || OAM Obs. || — || align=right | 2.4 km || 
|-id=723 bgcolor=#E9E9E9
| 378723 ||  || — || August 26, 2008 || Socorro || LINEAR || DOR || align=right | 3.2 km || 
|-id=724 bgcolor=#E9E9E9
| 378724 ||  || — || December 1, 2005 || Mount Lemmon || Mount Lemmon Survey || — || align=right | 3.2 km || 
|-id=725 bgcolor=#E9E9E9
| 378725 ||  || — || August 29, 2008 || La Sagra || OAM Obs. || — || align=right | 3.2 km || 
|-id=726 bgcolor=#E9E9E9
| 378726 ||  || — || August 30, 2008 || La Sagra || OAM Obs. || — || align=right | 4.1 km || 
|-id=727 bgcolor=#E9E9E9
| 378727 ||  || — || March 15, 2007 || Mount Lemmon || Mount Lemmon Survey || — || align=right | 1.9 km || 
|-id=728 bgcolor=#E9E9E9
| 378728 ||  || — || August 23, 2008 || Kitt Peak || Spacewatch || — || align=right | 2.3 km || 
|-id=729 bgcolor=#E9E9E9
| 378729 ||  || — || August 21, 2008 || Kitt Peak || Spacewatch || — || align=right | 1.8 km || 
|-id=730 bgcolor=#E9E9E9
| 378730 ||  || — || August 24, 2008 || Kitt Peak || Spacewatch || AGN || align=right | 1.4 km || 
|-id=731 bgcolor=#E9E9E9
| 378731 ||  || — || August 30, 2008 || Socorro || LINEAR || DOR || align=right | 2.9 km || 
|-id=732 bgcolor=#E9E9E9
| 378732 ||  || — || August 30, 2008 || Socorro || LINEAR || — || align=right | 2.2 km || 
|-id=733 bgcolor=#E9E9E9
| 378733 ||  || — || August 19, 2008 || Siding Spring || SSS || — || align=right | 3.7 km || 
|-id=734 bgcolor=#E9E9E9
| 378734 ||  || — || September 2, 2008 || Kitt Peak || Spacewatch || — || align=right | 2.8 km || 
|-id=735 bgcolor=#E9E9E9
| 378735 ||  || — || September 2, 2008 || Kitt Peak || Spacewatch || — || align=right | 1.2 km || 
|-id=736 bgcolor=#E9E9E9
| 378736 ||  || — || September 4, 2008 || Kitt Peak || Spacewatch || HOF || align=right | 2.9 km || 
|-id=737 bgcolor=#E9E9E9
| 378737 ||  || — || August 24, 2008 || Kitt Peak || Spacewatch || — || align=right | 2.3 km || 
|-id=738 bgcolor=#E9E9E9
| 378738 ||  || — || February 21, 2006 || Mount Lemmon || Mount Lemmon Survey || — || align=right | 1.8 km || 
|-id=739 bgcolor=#E9E9E9
| 378739 ||  || — || May 11, 2007 || Mount Lemmon || Mount Lemmon Survey || — || align=right | 1.9 km || 
|-id=740 bgcolor=#E9E9E9
| 378740 ||  || — || September 2, 2008 || Kitt Peak || Spacewatch || HOF || align=right | 3.0 km || 
|-id=741 bgcolor=#E9E9E9
| 378741 ||  || — || September 2, 2008 || Kitt Peak || Spacewatch || — || align=right | 2.2 km || 
|-id=742 bgcolor=#d6d6d6
| 378742 ||  || — || September 2, 2008 || Kitt Peak || Spacewatch || — || align=right | 2.2 km || 
|-id=743 bgcolor=#E9E9E9
| 378743 ||  || — || September 3, 2008 || Kitt Peak || Spacewatch || — || align=right | 2.5 km || 
|-id=744 bgcolor=#E9E9E9
| 378744 ||  || — || September 4, 2008 || Kitt Peak || Spacewatch || WIT || align=right data-sort-value="0.88" | 880 m || 
|-id=745 bgcolor=#d6d6d6
| 378745 ||  || — || September 4, 2008 || Kitt Peak || Spacewatch || KOR || align=right | 1.5 km || 
|-id=746 bgcolor=#E9E9E9
| 378746 ||  || — || September 5, 2008 || Kitt Peak || Spacewatch || NEM || align=right | 2.2 km || 
|-id=747 bgcolor=#FA8072
| 378747 ||  || — || September 6, 2008 || Catalina || CSS || — || align=right data-sort-value="0.98" | 980 m || 
|-id=748 bgcolor=#d6d6d6
| 378748 ||  || — || September 6, 2008 || Kitt Peak || Spacewatch || K-2 || align=right | 1.3 km || 
|-id=749 bgcolor=#E9E9E9
| 378749 ||  || — || September 6, 2008 || Kitt Peak || Spacewatch || AGN || align=right | 1.3 km || 
|-id=750 bgcolor=#d6d6d6
| 378750 ||  || — || September 6, 2008 || Kitt Peak || Spacewatch || — || align=right | 2.6 km || 
|-id=751 bgcolor=#E9E9E9
| 378751 ||  || — || September 7, 2008 || Mount Lemmon || Mount Lemmon Survey || PAD || align=right | 1.5 km || 
|-id=752 bgcolor=#E9E9E9
| 378752 ||  || — || September 2, 2008 || Kitt Peak || Spacewatch || — || align=right | 1.5 km || 
|-id=753 bgcolor=#d6d6d6
| 378753 ||  || — || September 2, 2008 || Kitt Peak || Spacewatch || — || align=right | 1.9 km || 
|-id=754 bgcolor=#E9E9E9
| 378754 ||  || — || September 5, 2008 || Kitt Peak || Spacewatch || WIT || align=right | 1.1 km || 
|-id=755 bgcolor=#E9E9E9
| 378755 ||  || — || September 6, 2008 || Mount Lemmon || Mount Lemmon Survey || — || align=right | 2.7 km || 
|-id=756 bgcolor=#E9E9E9
| 378756 ||  || — || September 4, 2008 || Kitt Peak || Spacewatch || — || align=right | 2.3 km || 
|-id=757 bgcolor=#E9E9E9
| 378757 ||  || — || September 6, 2008 || Kitt Peak || Spacewatch || — || align=right | 1.9 km || 
|-id=758 bgcolor=#d6d6d6
| 378758 ||  || — || September 7, 2008 || Mount Lemmon || Mount Lemmon Survey || KAR || align=right | 1.0 km || 
|-id=759 bgcolor=#d6d6d6
| 378759 ||  || — || September 9, 2008 || Kitt Peak || Spacewatch || BRA || align=right | 1.4 km || 
|-id=760 bgcolor=#E9E9E9
| 378760 ||  || — || September 9, 2008 || Mount Lemmon || Mount Lemmon Survey || AGN || align=right | 1.1 km || 
|-id=761 bgcolor=#d6d6d6
| 378761 ||  || — || September 9, 2008 || Mount Lemmon || Mount Lemmon Survey || — || align=right | 2.9 km || 
|-id=762 bgcolor=#d6d6d6
| 378762 ||  || — || September 7, 2008 || Mount Lemmon || Mount Lemmon Survey || ALA || align=right | 4.2 km || 
|-id=763 bgcolor=#E9E9E9
| 378763 ||  || — || September 3, 2008 || Kitt Peak || Spacewatch || — || align=right | 1.9 km || 
|-id=764 bgcolor=#d6d6d6
| 378764 ||  || — || September 6, 2008 || Kitt Peak || Spacewatch || KAR || align=right | 1.0 km || 
|-id=765 bgcolor=#E9E9E9
| 378765 ||  || — || September 7, 2008 || Mount Lemmon || Mount Lemmon Survey || HEN || align=right | 1.1 km || 
|-id=766 bgcolor=#d6d6d6
| 378766 ||  || — || September 4, 2008 || Kitt Peak || Spacewatch || — || align=right | 2.2 km || 
|-id=767 bgcolor=#E9E9E9
| 378767 ||  || — || September 3, 2008 || Kitt Peak || Spacewatch || — || align=right | 2.1 km || 
|-id=768 bgcolor=#E9E9E9
| 378768 ||  || — || September 9, 2008 || Mount Lemmon || Mount Lemmon Survey || AGN || align=right | 1.4 km || 
|-id=769 bgcolor=#E9E9E9
| 378769 ||  || — || September 7, 2008 || Socorro || LINEAR || — || align=right | 3.9 km || 
|-id=770 bgcolor=#d6d6d6
| 378770 ||  || — || September 2, 2008 || Kitt Peak || Spacewatch || — || align=right | 3.4 km || 
|-id=771 bgcolor=#E9E9E9
| 378771 ||  || — || September 6, 2008 || Kitt Peak || Spacewatch || AST || align=right | 1.5 km || 
|-id=772 bgcolor=#d6d6d6
| 378772 ||  || — || September 9, 2008 || Catalina || CSS || — || align=right | 4.0 km || 
|-id=773 bgcolor=#E9E9E9
| 378773 ||  || — || September 22, 2008 || Sierra Stars || F. Tozzi || GEF || align=right | 1.5 km || 
|-id=774 bgcolor=#d6d6d6
| 378774 ||  || — || September 22, 2008 || Socorro || LINEAR || — || align=right | 3.1 km || 
|-id=775 bgcolor=#E9E9E9
| 378775 ||  || — || January 25, 2006 || Kitt Peak || Spacewatch || — || align=right | 2.9 km || 
|-id=776 bgcolor=#E9E9E9
| 378776 ||  || — || September 7, 2008 || Mount Lemmon || Mount Lemmon Survey || — || align=right | 1.2 km || 
|-id=777 bgcolor=#E9E9E9
| 378777 ||  || — || September 19, 2008 || Kitt Peak || Spacewatch || PAD || align=right | 1.8 km || 
|-id=778 bgcolor=#E9E9E9
| 378778 ||  || — || September 19, 2008 || Kitt Peak || Spacewatch || — || align=right | 2.0 km || 
|-id=779 bgcolor=#E9E9E9
| 378779 ||  || — || September 19, 2008 || Kitt Peak || Spacewatch || — || align=right | 2.5 km || 
|-id=780 bgcolor=#E9E9E9
| 378780 ||  || — || September 19, 2008 || Kitt Peak || Spacewatch || AGN || align=right | 1.3 km || 
|-id=781 bgcolor=#d6d6d6
| 378781 ||  || — || September 9, 2008 || Kitt Peak || Spacewatch || 615 || align=right | 1.5 km || 
|-id=782 bgcolor=#d6d6d6
| 378782 ||  || — || September 20, 2008 || Kitt Peak || Spacewatch || — || align=right | 2.9 km || 
|-id=783 bgcolor=#E9E9E9
| 378783 ||  || — || July 29, 2008 || Kitt Peak || Spacewatch || — || align=right | 2.1 km || 
|-id=784 bgcolor=#E9E9E9
| 378784 ||  || — || September 20, 2008 || Mount Lemmon || Mount Lemmon Survey || — || align=right | 2.5 km || 
|-id=785 bgcolor=#E9E9E9
| 378785 ||  || — || September 3, 2008 || Kitt Peak || Spacewatch || HOF || align=right | 2.7 km || 
|-id=786 bgcolor=#d6d6d6
| 378786 ||  || — || September 20, 2008 || Mount Lemmon || Mount Lemmon Survey || — || align=right | 2.4 km || 
|-id=787 bgcolor=#d6d6d6
| 378787 ||  || — || September 21, 2008 || Kitt Peak || Spacewatch || KOR || align=right | 1.5 km || 
|-id=788 bgcolor=#E9E9E9
| 378788 ||  || — || September 3, 2008 || Kitt Peak || Spacewatch || INO || align=right | 1.2 km || 
|-id=789 bgcolor=#E9E9E9
| 378789 ||  || — || September 23, 2008 || Mount Lemmon || Mount Lemmon Survey || — || align=right | 3.2 km || 
|-id=790 bgcolor=#E9E9E9
| 378790 ||  || — || August 24, 2008 || Kitt Peak || Spacewatch || — || align=right | 2.5 km || 
|-id=791 bgcolor=#E9E9E9
| 378791 ||  || — || September 27, 2008 || Taunus || E. Schwab, R. Kling || NEM || align=right | 2.2 km || 
|-id=792 bgcolor=#E9E9E9
| 378792 ||  || — || September 20, 2008 || Kitt Peak || Spacewatch || — || align=right | 2.2 km || 
|-id=793 bgcolor=#E9E9E9
| 378793 ||  || — || September 21, 2008 || Catalina || CSS || — || align=right | 3.2 km || 
|-id=794 bgcolor=#E9E9E9
| 378794 ||  || — || September 21, 2008 || Kitt Peak || Spacewatch || — || align=right | 2.4 km || 
|-id=795 bgcolor=#d6d6d6
| 378795 ||  || — || September 21, 2008 || Kitt Peak || Spacewatch || — || align=right | 2.8 km || 
|-id=796 bgcolor=#d6d6d6
| 378796 ||  || — || September 21, 2008 || Mount Lemmon || Mount Lemmon Survey || CHA || align=right | 2.0 km || 
|-id=797 bgcolor=#d6d6d6
| 378797 ||  || — || September 22, 2008 || Kitt Peak || Spacewatch || KOR || align=right | 1.5 km || 
|-id=798 bgcolor=#E9E9E9
| 378798 ||  || — || September 22, 2008 || Kitt Peak || Spacewatch || AGN || align=right | 1.3 km || 
|-id=799 bgcolor=#E9E9E9
| 378799 ||  || — || September 22, 2008 || Mount Lemmon || Mount Lemmon Survey || — || align=right | 2.3 km || 
|-id=800 bgcolor=#E9E9E9
| 378800 ||  || — || September 23, 2008 || Kitt Peak || Spacewatch || — || align=right | 1.9 km || 
|}

378801–378900 

|-bgcolor=#d6d6d6
| 378801 ||  || — || September 23, 2008 || Kitt Peak || Spacewatch || — || align=right | 4.6 km || 
|-id=802 bgcolor=#E9E9E9
| 378802 ||  || — || September 28, 2008 || Socorro || LINEAR || — || align=right | 2.5 km || 
|-id=803 bgcolor=#d6d6d6
| 378803 ||  || — || September 22, 2008 || Catalina || CSS || BRA || align=right | 2.0 km || 
|-id=804 bgcolor=#E9E9E9
| 378804 ||  || — || September 22, 2008 || Catalina || CSS || CLO || align=right | 3.0 km || 
|-id=805 bgcolor=#E9E9E9
| 378805 ||  || — || September 25, 2008 || Kitt Peak || Spacewatch || — || align=right | 2.3 km || 
|-id=806 bgcolor=#d6d6d6
| 378806 ||  || — || September 25, 2008 || Kitt Peak || Spacewatch || — || align=right | 1.9 km || 
|-id=807 bgcolor=#E9E9E9
| 378807 ||  || — || September 25, 2008 || Mount Lemmon || Mount Lemmon Survey || — || align=right | 2.5 km || 
|-id=808 bgcolor=#d6d6d6
| 378808 ||  || — || September 25, 2008 || Kitt Peak || Spacewatch || KOR || align=right | 1.3 km || 
|-id=809 bgcolor=#d6d6d6
| 378809 ||  || — || September 26, 2008 || Kitt Peak || Spacewatch || — || align=right | 3.4 km || 
|-id=810 bgcolor=#FA8072
| 378810 ||  || — || September 28, 2008 || Charleston || ARO || — || align=right data-sort-value="0.50" | 500 m || 
|-id=811 bgcolor=#E9E9E9
| 378811 ||  || — || September 3, 2008 || Kitt Peak || Spacewatch || HOF || align=right | 2.5 km || 
|-id=812 bgcolor=#E9E9E9
| 378812 ||  || — || March 9, 2007 || Kitt Peak || Spacewatch || DOR || align=right | 3.2 km || 
|-id=813 bgcolor=#d6d6d6
| 378813 ||  || — || September 29, 2008 || Mount Lemmon || Mount Lemmon Survey || KOR || align=right | 1.2 km || 
|-id=814 bgcolor=#d6d6d6
| 378814 ||  || — || September 30, 2008 || Mount Lemmon || Mount Lemmon Survey || — || align=right | 2.8 km || 
|-id=815 bgcolor=#d6d6d6
| 378815 ||  || — || September 26, 2008 || Kitt Peak || Spacewatch || — || align=right | 2.2 km || 
|-id=816 bgcolor=#E9E9E9
| 378816 ||  || — || September 28, 2008 || Mount Lemmon || Mount Lemmon Survey || HOF || align=right | 2.7 km || 
|-id=817 bgcolor=#d6d6d6
| 378817 ||  || — || September 24, 2008 || Kitt Peak || Spacewatch || KAR || align=right data-sort-value="0.94" | 940 m || 
|-id=818 bgcolor=#E9E9E9
| 378818 ||  || — || September 22, 2008 || Catalina || CSS || GEF || align=right | 1.8 km || 
|-id=819 bgcolor=#E9E9E9
| 378819 ||  || — || September 23, 2008 || Kitt Peak || Spacewatch || AGN || align=right | 1.1 km || 
|-id=820 bgcolor=#d6d6d6
| 378820 ||  || — || September 23, 2008 || Catalina || CSS || EOS || align=right | 1.9 km || 
|-id=821 bgcolor=#d6d6d6
| 378821 ||  || — || September 23, 2008 || Kitt Peak || Spacewatch || CHA || align=right | 2.3 km || 
|-id=822 bgcolor=#d6d6d6
| 378822 ||  || — || September 23, 2008 || Mount Lemmon || Mount Lemmon Survey || BRA || align=right | 1.3 km || 
|-id=823 bgcolor=#d6d6d6
| 378823 ||  || — || September 23, 2008 || Kitt Peak || Spacewatch || — || align=right | 1.9 km || 
|-id=824 bgcolor=#d6d6d6
| 378824 ||  || — || September 25, 2008 || Kitt Peak || Spacewatch || — || align=right | 2.0 km || 
|-id=825 bgcolor=#d6d6d6
| 378825 ||  || — || September 24, 2008 || Mount Lemmon || Mount Lemmon Survey || — || align=right | 3.7 km || 
|-id=826 bgcolor=#d6d6d6
| 378826 ||  || — || September 29, 2008 || Kitt Peak || Spacewatch || — || align=right | 2.9 km || 
|-id=827 bgcolor=#d6d6d6
| 378827 ||  || — || September 24, 2008 || Mount Lemmon || Mount Lemmon Survey || — || align=right | 3.6 km || 
|-id=828 bgcolor=#d6d6d6
| 378828 ||  || — || September 29, 2008 || Mount Lemmon || Mount Lemmon Survey || EOS || align=right | 1.9 km || 
|-id=829 bgcolor=#E9E9E9
| 378829 ||  || — || September 24, 2008 || Kitt Peak || Spacewatch || WIT || align=right data-sort-value="0.86" | 860 m || 
|-id=830 bgcolor=#E9E9E9
| 378830 ||  || — || April 18, 2007 || Mount Lemmon || Mount Lemmon Survey || — || align=right data-sort-value="0.99" | 990 m || 
|-id=831 bgcolor=#d6d6d6
| 378831 ||  || — || September 28, 2008 || Mount Lemmon || Mount Lemmon Survey || — || align=right | 2.9 km || 
|-id=832 bgcolor=#d6d6d6
| 378832 ||  || — || September 29, 2008 || Mount Lemmon || Mount Lemmon Survey || EUP || align=right | 4.3 km || 
|-id=833 bgcolor=#E9E9E9
| 378833 ||  || — || September 24, 2008 || Catalina || CSS || — || align=right | 2.2 km || 
|-id=834 bgcolor=#d6d6d6
| 378834 ||  || — || September 29, 2008 || Mount Lemmon || Mount Lemmon Survey || EOS || align=right | 1.8 km || 
|-id=835 bgcolor=#d6d6d6
| 378835 ||  || — || September 22, 2008 || Mount Lemmon || Mount Lemmon Survey || — || align=right | 2.7 km || 
|-id=836 bgcolor=#d6d6d6
| 378836 ||  || — || September 22, 2008 || Mount Lemmon || Mount Lemmon Survey || KAR || align=right | 1.0 km || 
|-id=837 bgcolor=#d6d6d6
| 378837 ||  || — || September 23, 2008 || Mount Lemmon || Mount Lemmon Survey || CHA || align=right | 1.9 km || 
|-id=838 bgcolor=#d6d6d6
| 378838 ||  || — || September 23, 2008 || Mount Lemmon || Mount Lemmon Survey || URS || align=right | 3.4 km || 
|-id=839 bgcolor=#E9E9E9
| 378839 ||  || — || September 21, 2008 || Catalina || CSS || DOR || align=right | 3.3 km || 
|-id=840 bgcolor=#E9E9E9
| 378840 ||  || — || September 29, 2008 || Mount Lemmon || Mount Lemmon Survey || — || align=right | 3.2 km || 
|-id=841 bgcolor=#d6d6d6
| 378841 ||  || — || September 29, 2008 || Catalina || CSS || — || align=right | 4.4 km || 
|-id=842 bgcolor=#FFC2E0
| 378842 ||  || — || October 7, 2008 || Catalina || CSS || APOcritical || align=right data-sort-value="0.41" | 410 m || 
|-id=843 bgcolor=#d6d6d6
| 378843 ||  || — || August 24, 2008 || Kitt Peak || Spacewatch || EOS || align=right | 1.8 km || 
|-id=844 bgcolor=#E9E9E9
| 378844 ||  || — || October 1, 2008 || Mount Lemmon || Mount Lemmon Survey || — || align=right | 2.1 km || 
|-id=845 bgcolor=#d6d6d6
| 378845 ||  || — || October 1, 2008 || Mount Lemmon || Mount Lemmon Survey || KOR || align=right | 1.4 km || 
|-id=846 bgcolor=#d6d6d6
| 378846 ||  || — || October 1, 2008 || Mount Lemmon || Mount Lemmon Survey || — || align=right | 3.4 km || 
|-id=847 bgcolor=#d6d6d6
| 378847 ||  || — || October 1, 2008 || Mount Lemmon || Mount Lemmon Survey || — || align=right | 2.3 km || 
|-id=848 bgcolor=#d6d6d6
| 378848 ||  || — || October 1, 2008 || Mount Lemmon || Mount Lemmon Survey || — || align=right | 2.8 km || 
|-id=849 bgcolor=#E9E9E9
| 378849 ||  || — || October 2, 2008 || Mount Lemmon || Mount Lemmon Survey || HOF || align=right | 2.5 km || 
|-id=850 bgcolor=#E9E9E9
| 378850 ||  || — || October 1, 2008 || Catalina || CSS || CLO || align=right | 3.3 km || 
|-id=851 bgcolor=#d6d6d6
| 378851 ||  || — || September 24, 2008 || Kitt Peak || Spacewatch || KOR || align=right | 1.3 km || 
|-id=852 bgcolor=#d6d6d6
| 378852 ||  || — || October 1, 2008 || Kitt Peak || Spacewatch || KOR || align=right | 1.2 km || 
|-id=853 bgcolor=#d6d6d6
| 378853 ||  || — || October 1, 2008 || Kitt Peak || Spacewatch || KOR || align=right | 1.3 km || 
|-id=854 bgcolor=#E9E9E9
| 378854 ||  || — || October 2, 2008 || Kitt Peak || Spacewatch || — || align=right | 1.9 km || 
|-id=855 bgcolor=#d6d6d6
| 378855 ||  || — || March 26, 2006 || Mount Lemmon || Mount Lemmon Survey || CHA || align=right | 1.9 km || 
|-id=856 bgcolor=#E9E9E9
| 378856 ||  || — || October 2, 2008 || Catalina || CSS || DOR || align=right | 4.0 km || 
|-id=857 bgcolor=#E9E9E9
| 378857 ||  || — || October 2, 2008 || Kitt Peak || Spacewatch || AGN || align=right | 1.1 km || 
|-id=858 bgcolor=#d6d6d6
| 378858 ||  || — || October 2, 2008 || Kitt Peak || Spacewatch || KOR || align=right | 1.5 km || 
|-id=859 bgcolor=#d6d6d6
| 378859 ||  || — || October 2, 2008 || Mount Lemmon || Mount Lemmon Survey || — || align=right | 2.1 km || 
|-id=860 bgcolor=#E9E9E9
| 378860 ||  || — || October 3, 2008 || Kitt Peak || Spacewatch || HOF || align=right | 2.9 km || 
|-id=861 bgcolor=#E9E9E9
| 378861 ||  || — || October 3, 2008 || Kitt Peak || Spacewatch || AGN || align=right | 1.7 km || 
|-id=862 bgcolor=#E9E9E9
| 378862 ||  || — || October 3, 2008 || Mount Lemmon || Mount Lemmon Survey || WIT || align=right | 1.0 km || 
|-id=863 bgcolor=#d6d6d6
| 378863 ||  || — || September 24, 2008 || Kitt Peak || Spacewatch || CHA || align=right | 2.7 km || 
|-id=864 bgcolor=#E9E9E9
| 378864 ||  || — || October 6, 2008 || Kitt Peak || Spacewatch || WIT || align=right | 1.2 km || 
|-id=865 bgcolor=#d6d6d6
| 378865 ||  || — || October 6, 2008 || Kitt Peak || Spacewatch || K-2 || align=right | 1.3 km || 
|-id=866 bgcolor=#d6d6d6
| 378866 ||  || — || October 6, 2008 || Kitt Peak || Spacewatch || KAR || align=right | 1.1 km || 
|-id=867 bgcolor=#E9E9E9
| 378867 ||  || — || October 6, 2008 || Kitt Peak || Spacewatch || — || align=right | 2.3 km || 
|-id=868 bgcolor=#E9E9E9
| 378868 ||  || — || October 6, 2008 || Kitt Peak || Spacewatch || — || align=right | 2.9 km || 
|-id=869 bgcolor=#d6d6d6
| 378869 ||  || — || October 6, 2008 || Mount Lemmon || Mount Lemmon Survey || KAR || align=right | 1.2 km || 
|-id=870 bgcolor=#d6d6d6
| 378870 ||  || — || October 6, 2008 || Kitt Peak || Spacewatch || — || align=right | 3.1 km || 
|-id=871 bgcolor=#d6d6d6
| 378871 ||  || — || October 7, 2008 || Kitt Peak || Spacewatch || NAE || align=right | 3.3 km || 
|-id=872 bgcolor=#d6d6d6
| 378872 ||  || — || October 7, 2008 || Kitt Peak || Spacewatch || — || align=right | 2.9 km || 
|-id=873 bgcolor=#E9E9E9
| 378873 ||  || — || October 8, 2008 || Mount Lemmon || Mount Lemmon Survey || — || align=right | 2.4 km || 
|-id=874 bgcolor=#E9E9E9
| 378874 ||  || — || September 23, 2008 || Kitt Peak || Spacewatch || AGN || align=right | 1.3 km || 
|-id=875 bgcolor=#d6d6d6
| 378875 ||  || — || October 8, 2008 || Mount Lemmon || Mount Lemmon Survey || — || align=right | 2.3 km || 
|-id=876 bgcolor=#d6d6d6
| 378876 ||  || — || October 8, 2008 || Mount Lemmon || Mount Lemmon Survey || — || align=right | 2.7 km || 
|-id=877 bgcolor=#d6d6d6
| 378877 ||  || — || October 8, 2008 || Kitt Peak || Spacewatch || — || align=right | 2.8 km || 
|-id=878 bgcolor=#d6d6d6
| 378878 ||  || — || October 8, 2008 || Kitt Peak || Spacewatch || — || align=right | 2.0 km || 
|-id=879 bgcolor=#E9E9E9
| 378879 ||  || — || October 9, 2008 || Mount Lemmon || Mount Lemmon Survey || DOR || align=right | 3.2 km || 
|-id=880 bgcolor=#E9E9E9
| 378880 ||  || — || October 9, 2008 || Mount Lemmon || Mount Lemmon Survey || INO || align=right | 1.4 km || 
|-id=881 bgcolor=#E9E9E9
| 378881 ||  || — || October 9, 2008 || Mount Lemmon || Mount Lemmon Survey || AGN || align=right | 1.3 km || 
|-id=882 bgcolor=#E9E9E9
| 378882 ||  || — || October 8, 2008 || Kitt Peak || Spacewatch || — || align=right | 2.0 km || 
|-id=883 bgcolor=#d6d6d6
| 378883 ||  || — || October 7, 2008 || Kitt Peak || Spacewatch || CHA || align=right | 1.8 km || 
|-id=884 bgcolor=#d6d6d6
| 378884 ||  || — || October 2, 2008 || Mount Lemmon || Mount Lemmon Survey || BRA || align=right | 1.4 km || 
|-id=885 bgcolor=#d6d6d6
| 378885 ||  || — || October 8, 2008 || Mount Lemmon || Mount Lemmon Survey || — || align=right | 2.9 km || 
|-id=886 bgcolor=#d6d6d6
| 378886 ||  || — || October 9, 2008 || Mount Lemmon || Mount Lemmon Survey || — || align=right | 2.4 km || 
|-id=887 bgcolor=#d6d6d6
| 378887 ||  || — || October 2, 2008 || Kitt Peak || Spacewatch || KOR || align=right | 1.3 km || 
|-id=888 bgcolor=#d6d6d6
| 378888 ||  || — || October 6, 2008 || Mount Lemmon || Mount Lemmon Survey || TRP || align=right | 2.4 km || 
|-id=889 bgcolor=#d6d6d6
| 378889 ||  || — || October 10, 2008 || Kitt Peak || Spacewatch || KAR || align=right | 1.1 km || 
|-id=890 bgcolor=#E9E9E9
| 378890 ||  || — || October 10, 2008 || Catalina || CSS || TIN || align=right | 1.5 km || 
|-id=891 bgcolor=#E9E9E9
| 378891 ||  || — || September 24, 2008 || Kitt Peak || Spacewatch || GEF || align=right | 1.6 km || 
|-id=892 bgcolor=#d6d6d6
| 378892 ||  || — || October 17, 2008 || Kitt Peak || Spacewatch || KAR || align=right | 1.0 km || 
|-id=893 bgcolor=#d6d6d6
| 378893 ||  || — || October 20, 2008 || Mount Lemmon || Mount Lemmon Survey || K-2 || align=right | 1.3 km || 
|-id=894 bgcolor=#d6d6d6
| 378894 ||  || — || October 20, 2008 || Kitt Peak || Spacewatch || — || align=right | 2.3 km || 
|-id=895 bgcolor=#d6d6d6
| 378895 ||  || — || October 20, 2008 || Kitt Peak || Spacewatch || — || align=right | 2.5 km || 
|-id=896 bgcolor=#d6d6d6
| 378896 ||  || — || October 20, 2008 || Kitt Peak || Spacewatch || K-2 || align=right | 1.3 km || 
|-id=897 bgcolor=#d6d6d6
| 378897 ||  || — || October 20, 2008 || Kitt Peak || Spacewatch || EOS || align=right | 1.9 km || 
|-id=898 bgcolor=#d6d6d6
| 378898 ||  || — || October 20, 2008 || Kitt Peak || Spacewatch || EMA || align=right | 3.7 km || 
|-id=899 bgcolor=#d6d6d6
| 378899 ||  || — || October 20, 2008 || Kitt Peak || Spacewatch || EOS || align=right | 2.2 km || 
|-id=900 bgcolor=#d6d6d6
| 378900 ||  || — || October 20, 2008 || Kitt Peak || Spacewatch || THM || align=right | 1.8 km || 
|}

378901–379000 

|-bgcolor=#d6d6d6
| 378901 ||  || — || October 20, 2008 || Mount Lemmon || Mount Lemmon Survey || — || align=right | 2.4 km || 
|-id=902 bgcolor=#d6d6d6
| 378902 ||  || — || October 20, 2008 || Kitt Peak || Spacewatch || SAN || align=right | 1.7 km || 
|-id=903 bgcolor=#d6d6d6
| 378903 ||  || — || October 20, 2008 || Kitt Peak || Spacewatch || — || align=right | 2.3 km || 
|-id=904 bgcolor=#d6d6d6
| 378904 ||  || — || October 20, 2008 || Kitt Peak || Spacewatch || — || align=right | 3.5 km || 
|-id=905 bgcolor=#d6d6d6
| 378905 ||  || — || October 20, 2008 || Kitt Peak || Spacewatch || — || align=right | 2.3 km || 
|-id=906 bgcolor=#d6d6d6
| 378906 ||  || — || October 21, 2008 || Kitt Peak || Spacewatch || KOR || align=right | 1.5 km || 
|-id=907 bgcolor=#d6d6d6
| 378907 ||  || — || October 21, 2008 || Kitt Peak || Spacewatch || EOS || align=right | 1.8 km || 
|-id=908 bgcolor=#d6d6d6
| 378908 ||  || — || October 21, 2008 || Kitt Peak || Spacewatch || — || align=right | 2.5 km || 
|-id=909 bgcolor=#d6d6d6
| 378909 ||  || — || October 21, 2008 || Kitt Peak || Spacewatch || — || align=right | 3.1 km || 
|-id=910 bgcolor=#d6d6d6
| 378910 ||  || — || October 21, 2008 || Kitt Peak || Spacewatch || — || align=right | 2.7 km || 
|-id=911 bgcolor=#d6d6d6
| 378911 ||  || — || October 21, 2008 || Kitt Peak || Spacewatch || — || align=right | 2.6 km || 
|-id=912 bgcolor=#d6d6d6
| 378912 ||  || — || October 21, 2008 || Mount Lemmon || Mount Lemmon Survey || — || align=right | 3.3 km || 
|-id=913 bgcolor=#d6d6d6
| 378913 ||  || — || October 21, 2008 || Kitt Peak || Spacewatch || — || align=right | 3.3 km || 
|-id=914 bgcolor=#d6d6d6
| 378914 ||  || — || October 21, 2008 || Kitt Peak || Spacewatch || — || align=right | 3.8 km || 
|-id=915 bgcolor=#d6d6d6
| 378915 ||  || — || October 22, 2008 || Kitt Peak || Spacewatch || — || align=right | 3.2 km || 
|-id=916 bgcolor=#d6d6d6
| 378916 ||  || — || October 23, 2008 || Kitt Peak || Spacewatch || — || align=right | 3.6 km || 
|-id=917 bgcolor=#d6d6d6
| 378917 Stefankarge ||  ||  || October 28, 2008 || Tzec Maun || E. Schwab || 628 || align=right | 1.7 km || 
|-id=918 bgcolor=#d6d6d6
| 378918 ||  || — || October 28, 2008 || Wrightwood || J. W. Young || URS || align=right | 5.1 km || 
|-id=919 bgcolor=#E9E9E9
| 378919 ||  || — || October 24, 2008 || Socorro || LINEAR || — || align=right | 3.1 km || 
|-id=920 bgcolor=#d6d6d6
| 378920 Vassimre ||  ||  || October 24, 2008 || Piszkéstető || K. Sárneczky, Á. Kárpáti || — || align=right | 2.0 km || 
|-id=921 bgcolor=#d6d6d6
| 378921 ||  || — || October 26, 2008 || Socorro || LINEAR || — || align=right | 3.5 km || 
|-id=922 bgcolor=#d6d6d6
| 378922 ||  || — || October 21, 2008 || Kitt Peak || Spacewatch || CHA || align=right | 1.8 km || 
|-id=923 bgcolor=#d6d6d6
| 378923 ||  || — || October 21, 2008 || Mount Lemmon || Mount Lemmon Survey || — || align=right | 3.8 km || 
|-id=924 bgcolor=#d6d6d6
| 378924 ||  || — || October 22, 2008 || Kitt Peak || Spacewatch || — || align=right | 2.4 km || 
|-id=925 bgcolor=#d6d6d6
| 378925 ||  || — || October 22, 2008 || Kitt Peak || Spacewatch || — || align=right | 2.5 km || 
|-id=926 bgcolor=#d6d6d6
| 378926 ||  || — || October 22, 2008 || Kitt Peak || Spacewatch || — || align=right | 3.9 km || 
|-id=927 bgcolor=#d6d6d6
| 378927 ||  || — || October 22, 2008 || Kitt Peak || Spacewatch || — || align=right | 3.0 km || 
|-id=928 bgcolor=#d6d6d6
| 378928 ||  || — || October 22, 2008 || Kitt Peak || Spacewatch || — || align=right | 2.9 km || 
|-id=929 bgcolor=#d6d6d6
| 378929 ||  || — || October 22, 2008 || Kitt Peak || Spacewatch || EOS || align=right | 4.1 km || 
|-id=930 bgcolor=#d6d6d6
| 378930 ||  || — || October 22, 2008 || Kitt Peak || Spacewatch || — || align=right | 4.0 km || 
|-id=931 bgcolor=#d6d6d6
| 378931 ||  || — || October 22, 2008 || Kitt Peak || Spacewatch || — || align=right | 3.8 km || 
|-id=932 bgcolor=#d6d6d6
| 378932 ||  || — || October 22, 2008 || Kitt Peak || Spacewatch || — || align=right | 2.8 km || 
|-id=933 bgcolor=#d6d6d6
| 378933 ||  || — || October 22, 2008 || Kitt Peak || Spacewatch || — || align=right | 2.8 km || 
|-id=934 bgcolor=#d6d6d6
| 378934 ||  || — || October 23, 2008 || Kitt Peak || Spacewatch || — || align=right | 2.4 km || 
|-id=935 bgcolor=#d6d6d6
| 378935 ||  || — || October 23, 2008 || Kitt Peak || Spacewatch || — || align=right | 2.6 km || 
|-id=936 bgcolor=#d6d6d6
| 378936 ||  || — || October 23, 2008 || Kitt Peak || Spacewatch || — || align=right | 2.3 km || 
|-id=937 bgcolor=#d6d6d6
| 378937 ||  || — || October 23, 2008 || Kitt Peak || Spacewatch || CHA || align=right | 2.1 km || 
|-id=938 bgcolor=#d6d6d6
| 378938 ||  || — || October 23, 2008 || Kitt Peak || Spacewatch || — || align=right | 3.5 km || 
|-id=939 bgcolor=#d6d6d6
| 378939 ||  || — || October 23, 2008 || Kitt Peak || Spacewatch || — || align=right | 2.8 km || 
|-id=940 bgcolor=#d6d6d6
| 378940 ||  || — || October 23, 2008 || Kitt Peak || Spacewatch || HYG || align=right | 2.3 km || 
|-id=941 bgcolor=#d6d6d6
| 378941 ||  || — || October 23, 2008 || Kitt Peak || Spacewatch || — || align=right | 4.9 km || 
|-id=942 bgcolor=#d6d6d6
| 378942 ||  || — || October 23, 2008 || Kitt Peak || Spacewatch || — || align=right | 2.5 km || 
|-id=943 bgcolor=#d6d6d6
| 378943 ||  || — || October 23, 2008 || Kitt Peak || Spacewatch || K-2 || align=right | 1.5 km || 
|-id=944 bgcolor=#d6d6d6
| 378944 ||  || — || October 23, 2008 || Kitt Peak || Spacewatch || — || align=right | 2.4 km || 
|-id=945 bgcolor=#d6d6d6
| 378945 ||  || — || October 23, 2008 || Mount Lemmon || Mount Lemmon Survey || — || align=right | 2.8 km || 
|-id=946 bgcolor=#d6d6d6
| 378946 ||  || — || October 23, 2008 || Kitt Peak || Spacewatch || — || align=right | 4.7 km || 
|-id=947 bgcolor=#d6d6d6
| 378947 ||  || — || October 24, 2008 || Kitt Peak || Spacewatch || — || align=right | 2.3 km || 
|-id=948 bgcolor=#d6d6d6
| 378948 ||  || — || October 24, 2008 || Mount Lemmon || Mount Lemmon Survey || — || align=right | 2.3 km || 
|-id=949 bgcolor=#d6d6d6
| 378949 ||  || — || October 24, 2008 || Mount Lemmon || Mount Lemmon Survey || BRA || align=right | 1.2 km || 
|-id=950 bgcolor=#d6d6d6
| 378950 ||  || — || September 26, 2008 || Kitt Peak || Spacewatch || — || align=right | 2.5 km || 
|-id=951 bgcolor=#d6d6d6
| 378951 ||  || — || October 24, 2008 || Kitt Peak || Spacewatch || — || align=right | 2.7 km || 
|-id=952 bgcolor=#d6d6d6
| 378952 ||  || — || October 24, 2008 || Kitt Peak || Spacewatch || — || align=right | 2.2 km || 
|-id=953 bgcolor=#d6d6d6
| 378953 ||  || — || October 24, 2008 || Kitt Peak || Spacewatch || — || align=right | 2.6 km || 
|-id=954 bgcolor=#d6d6d6
| 378954 ||  || — || October 24, 2008 || Kitt Peak || Spacewatch || — || align=right | 2.9 km || 
|-id=955 bgcolor=#d6d6d6
| 378955 ||  || — || October 24, 2008 || Kitt Peak || Spacewatch || — || align=right | 4.3 km || 
|-id=956 bgcolor=#E9E9E9
| 378956 ||  || — || October 25, 2008 || Mount Lemmon || Mount Lemmon Survey || MRX || align=right data-sort-value="0.89" | 890 m || 
|-id=957 bgcolor=#d6d6d6
| 378957 ||  || — || October 25, 2008 || Mount Lemmon || Mount Lemmon Survey || — || align=right | 2.3 km || 
|-id=958 bgcolor=#d6d6d6
| 378958 ||  || — || October 25, 2008 || Mount Lemmon || Mount Lemmon Survey || KOR || align=right | 1.5 km || 
|-id=959 bgcolor=#FA8072
| 378959 ||  || — || October 25, 2008 || Mount Lemmon || Mount Lemmon Survey || — || align=right data-sort-value="0.63" | 630 m || 
|-id=960 bgcolor=#d6d6d6
| 378960 ||  || — || October 27, 2008 || Kitt Peak || Spacewatch || KOR || align=right | 1.4 km || 
|-id=961 bgcolor=#E9E9E9
| 378961 ||  || — || August 25, 1998 || Caussols || ODAS || — || align=right | 3.0 km || 
|-id=962 bgcolor=#E9E9E9
| 378962 ||  || — || October 23, 2008 || Kitt Peak || Spacewatch || AGN || align=right | 1.3 km || 
|-id=963 bgcolor=#d6d6d6
| 378963 ||  || — || October 23, 2008 || Kitt Peak || Spacewatch || KOR || align=right | 1.5 km || 
|-id=964 bgcolor=#d6d6d6
| 378964 ||  || — || October 25, 2008 || Mount Lemmon || Mount Lemmon Survey || KOR || align=right | 1.4 km || 
|-id=965 bgcolor=#d6d6d6
| 378965 ||  || — || September 28, 2008 || Mount Lemmon || Mount Lemmon Survey || — || align=right | 3.2 km || 
|-id=966 bgcolor=#d6d6d6
| 378966 ||  || — || October 25, 2008 || Kitt Peak || Spacewatch || HYG || align=right | 2.9 km || 
|-id=967 bgcolor=#d6d6d6
| 378967 ||  || — || October 25, 2008 || Kitt Peak || Spacewatch || — || align=right | 3.3 km || 
|-id=968 bgcolor=#d6d6d6
| 378968 ||  || — || October 25, 2008 || Catalina || CSS || — || align=right | 3.6 km || 
|-id=969 bgcolor=#d6d6d6
| 378969 ||  || — || October 25, 2008 || Kitt Peak || Spacewatch || — || align=right | 3.7 km || 
|-id=970 bgcolor=#d6d6d6
| 378970 ||  || — || October 26, 2008 || Kitt Peak || Spacewatch || — || align=right | 2.7 km || 
|-id=971 bgcolor=#fefefe
| 378971 ||  || — || October 26, 2008 || Kitt Peak || Spacewatch || H || align=right data-sort-value="0.77" | 770 m || 
|-id=972 bgcolor=#d6d6d6
| 378972 ||  || — || October 26, 2008 || Kitt Peak || Spacewatch || CHA || align=right | 2.2 km || 
|-id=973 bgcolor=#d6d6d6
| 378973 ||  || — || October 26, 2008 || Kitt Peak || Spacewatch || EOS || align=right | 2.0 km || 
|-id=974 bgcolor=#d6d6d6
| 378974 ||  || — || October 26, 2008 || Kitt Peak || Spacewatch || EMA || align=right | 4.1 km || 
|-id=975 bgcolor=#d6d6d6
| 378975 ||  || — || October 26, 2008 || Kitt Peak || Spacewatch || EOS || align=right | 2.1 km || 
|-id=976 bgcolor=#d6d6d6
| 378976 ||  || — || October 26, 2008 || Mount Lemmon || Mount Lemmon Survey || BRA || align=right | 2.0 km || 
|-id=977 bgcolor=#d6d6d6
| 378977 ||  || — || October 26, 2008 || Kitt Peak || Spacewatch || — || align=right | 3.4 km || 
|-id=978 bgcolor=#d6d6d6
| 378978 ||  || — || October 27, 2008 || Kitt Peak || Spacewatch || — || align=right | 3.2 km || 
|-id=979 bgcolor=#d6d6d6
| 378979 ||  || — || October 27, 2008 || Kitt Peak || Spacewatch || — || align=right | 4.3 km || 
|-id=980 bgcolor=#d6d6d6
| 378980 ||  || — || October 27, 2008 || Kitt Peak || Spacewatch || EOS || align=right | 2.7 km || 
|-id=981 bgcolor=#d6d6d6
| 378981 ||  || — || October 27, 2008 || Kitt Peak || Spacewatch || — || align=right | 3.4 km || 
|-id=982 bgcolor=#d6d6d6
| 378982 ||  || — || October 28, 2008 || Kitt Peak || Spacewatch || — || align=right | 2.4 km || 
|-id=983 bgcolor=#d6d6d6
| 378983 ||  || — || October 28, 2008 || Kitt Peak || Spacewatch || HYG || align=right | 2.8 km || 
|-id=984 bgcolor=#d6d6d6
| 378984 ||  || — || October 28, 2008 || Kitt Peak || Spacewatch || — || align=right | 2.7 km || 
|-id=985 bgcolor=#d6d6d6
| 378985 ||  || — || October 28, 2008 || Mount Lemmon || Mount Lemmon Survey || — || align=right | 2.0 km || 
|-id=986 bgcolor=#d6d6d6
| 378986 ||  || — || October 28, 2008 || Mount Lemmon || Mount Lemmon Survey || — || align=right | 2.4 km || 
|-id=987 bgcolor=#d6d6d6
| 378987 ||  || — || October 28, 2008 || Mount Lemmon || Mount Lemmon Survey || KOR || align=right | 1.4 km || 
|-id=988 bgcolor=#d6d6d6
| 378988 ||  || — || October 28, 2008 || Kitt Peak || Spacewatch || — || align=right | 3.1 km || 
|-id=989 bgcolor=#d6d6d6
| 378989 ||  || — || October 28, 2008 || Kitt Peak || Spacewatch || — || align=right | 3.1 km || 
|-id=990 bgcolor=#d6d6d6
| 378990 ||  || — || October 28, 2008 || Kitt Peak || Spacewatch || — || align=right | 3.4 km || 
|-id=991 bgcolor=#d6d6d6
| 378991 ||  || — || October 6, 2008 || Kitt Peak || Spacewatch || — || align=right | 2.7 km || 
|-id=992 bgcolor=#d6d6d6
| 378992 ||  || — || October 29, 2008 || Kitt Peak || Spacewatch || FIR || align=right | 2.6 km || 
|-id=993 bgcolor=#d6d6d6
| 378993 ||  || — || October 29, 2008 || Kitt Peak || Spacewatch || — || align=right | 3.3 km || 
|-id=994 bgcolor=#d6d6d6
| 378994 ||  || — || October 30, 2008 || Kitt Peak || Spacewatch || — || align=right | 2.6 km || 
|-id=995 bgcolor=#E9E9E9
| 378995 ||  || — || October 30, 2008 || Catalina || CSS || — || align=right | 3.5 km || 
|-id=996 bgcolor=#d6d6d6
| 378996 ||  || — || October 30, 2008 || Kitt Peak || Spacewatch || — || align=right | 3.7 km || 
|-id=997 bgcolor=#d6d6d6
| 378997 ||  || — || October 30, 2008 || Kitt Peak || Spacewatch || — || align=right | 3.3 km || 
|-id=998 bgcolor=#d6d6d6
| 378998 ||  || — || October 30, 2008 || Kitt Peak || Spacewatch || — || align=right | 3.2 km || 
|-id=999 bgcolor=#d6d6d6
| 378999 ||  || — || October 31, 2008 || Kitt Peak || Spacewatch || — || align=right | 4.9 km || 
|-id=000 bgcolor=#d6d6d6
| 379000 ||  || — || October 23, 2008 || Kitt Peak || Spacewatch || — || align=right | 2.9 km || 
|}

References

External links 
 Discovery Circumstances: Numbered Minor Planets (375001)–(380000) (IAU Minor Planet Center)

0378